= Michael Jackson's Boys =

2005 TV interview documentary film

Michael Jackson's Boys (U.K.), Michael Jackson's Secret World (U.S.)
- Directed by: Helen Littleboy
- Produced by: Sam Dwyer
- Cinematography: Brendan Easton, camera: Derick Green
- Edited by: Joe Carey
- Music by: Colin Winston-Fletcher
- Production company: Tiger Aspect Productions
- Release date: 25 January 2005 (UK)
- Running time: 60 minutes (UK) 120 minutes (US)
- Country: United Kingdom
- Language: English

Michael Jackson's Boys (broadcast in the US as a Primetime Live special titled Michael Jackson's Secret World) Is a 2005 TV documentary made by Tiger Aspect Productions. It was first broadcast in the UK on Channel 4 in January 2005, narrated by Mark Strong, and in the US on ABC in February 2005, with narration by Martin Bashir.

The US version featured additional interviews, which increased the length of the documentary by an hour. The documentary was released just prior to the trial of Michael Jackson, and it focuses on a supposed history of Michael Jackson's interest in boys.

The film consists mostly of new interviews with people close to Jackson and archive footage. Some of the participants were given "compensation" for their interviews. The US version aired a disclaimer saying that while some of the interviews in the British version received compensation, no payment had been rendered for the interviews in the additional hour of footage.

== Cast ==
- Mark Strong (narrator (U.K. Version))
- Martin Bashir (narrator (U.S. Version))
- Frank Cascio
- Jordie Chandler (archive footage)
- Ray Chandler
- Bill Clinton (archive footage)
- Johnnie L. Cochran Jr. (archive footage)
- Macaulay Culkin (archive footage)
- Diane Dimond
- Bill Dworin
- Ahmad Elatab
- Juju Elatab
- Hanadi Fattouh
- Terry George (entrepreneur)
- Janet Jackson (archive footage)
- La Toya Jackson
- Michael Jackson (archive footage)
- Philip Lemarque
- Emmanuel Lewis
- Carole Lieberman
- Stella Marcroft
- Jamie Masada
- Stevie Nicks (archive footage)
- Maureen Orth
- Lisa Marie Presley (archive footage)
- Nancy Reagan (archive footage)
- Ronald Reagan (archive footage)
- James Safechuck (archive footage)
- Brooke Shields (archive footage)
- Thomas W. Sneddon, Jr. (archive footage)
- J. Randy Taraborrelli
- Scott Thorson
- Tatiana Thumbtzen
- Oprah Winfrey (archive footage)

== Reception ==
Susan Hidalgo and Robert G. Weiner of Texas Tech University assume that the film "uses hearsay, insinuations, and assumptions" and effects and music for creating "a sense of danger and fear".

== See also ==
- Square One: Michael Jackson, 2019 documentary about how and why Jackson was accused in 1993
- Michael Jackson: Chase the Truth, 2019 documentary presenting evidence for Jackson's innocence
- Leaving Neverland, 2019 documentary film about the alleged experiences of Wade Robson and James Safechuck with Michael Jackson
- Neverland Firsthand: Investigating the Michael Jackson Documentary, 2019 documentary showcasing evidence against Leaving Neverland
- Michael Jackson's Dangerous Liaisons, a 2010 book by paedophile activist Tom O'Carroll
