= Isaac Woodard =

American veteran and racial abuse victim (1919–1992)

Isaac Woodard Jr.
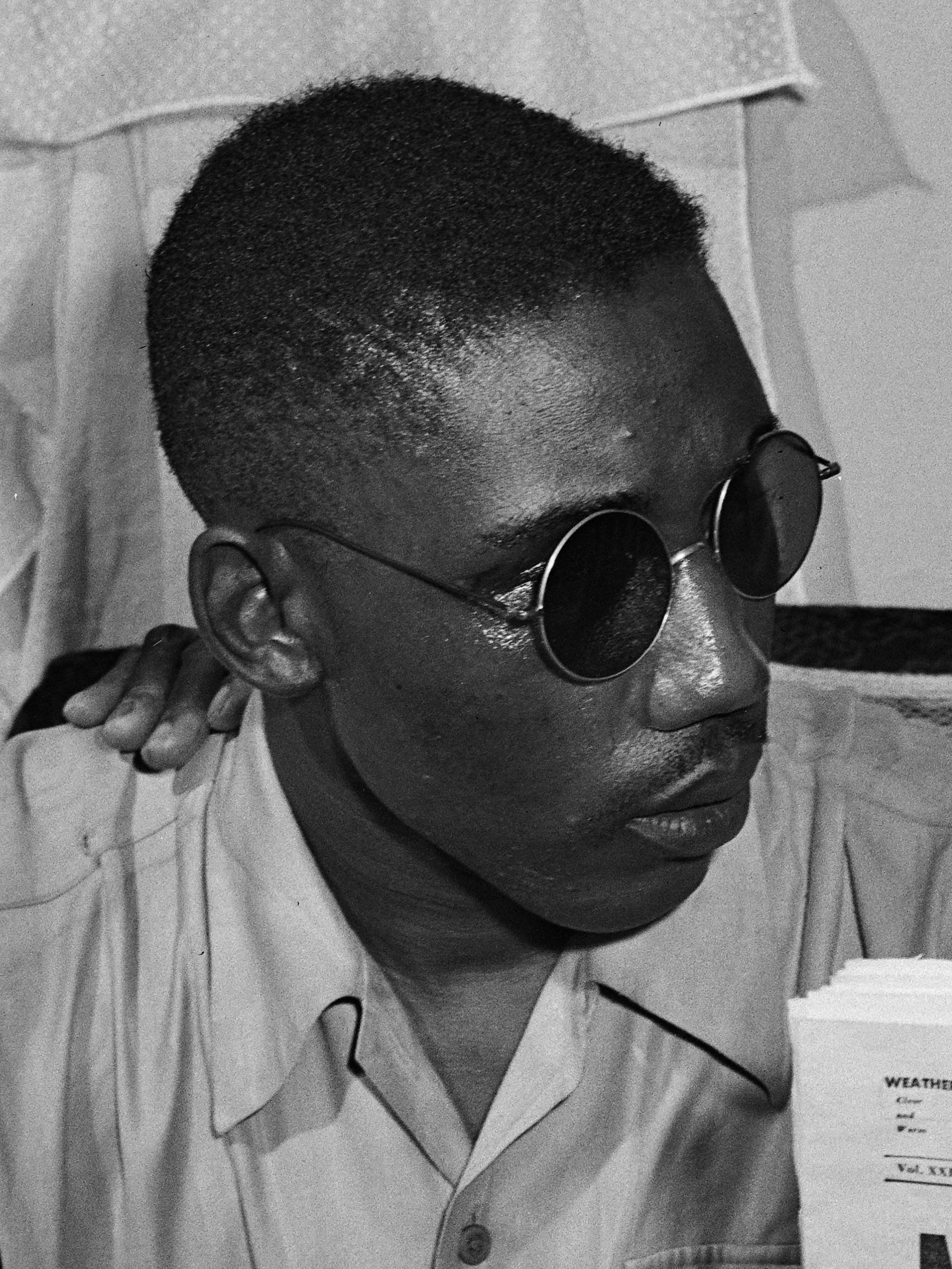
- Woodard in 1946
- Born: Isaac Woodard Jr. March 18, 1919; Fairfield County, South Carolina, U.S.
- Died: September 23, 1992 (aged 73); New York City, U.S.
- Burial place: Calverton National Cemetery
- Military career
- Allegiance: United States
- Branch: United States Army
- Service years: 1942–46
- Rank: Sergeant
- Conflicts: World War II; New Guinea campaign
- Awards: Good Conduct Medal; American Campaign Medal; Asiatic-Pacific Campaign Medal; World War II Victory Medal

Isaac Woodard Jr. (March 18, 1919 – September 23, 1992) was an American soldier and victim of racial violence. An African-American World War II veteran, on February 12, 1946, hours after being honorably discharged from the United States Army, he was attacked while still in uniform by South Carolina police as he was taking a bus home. The attack and his injuries sparked national outrage and galvanized the civil rights movement in the United States.

The attack left Woodard completely and permanently blind. Due to South Carolina's reluctance to pursue the case, President Harry S. Truman ordered a federal investigation. The police chief, Lynwood Shull, was indicted and went to trial in federal court in South Carolina, where he was acquitted by an all-white jury.

Such miscarriages of justice by state governments influenced a move toward civil rights initiatives at the federal level. Truman subsequently established a national interracial commission, made a historic speech to the NAACP and the nation in June 1947 in which he described civil rights as a moral priority, submitted a civil rights bill to Congress in February 1948, and issued Executive Orders 9980 and 9981 on July 26, 1948, desegregating the armed forces and the federal government.

== Early life and military service ==
Woodard was born in Fairfield County, South Carolina, and grew up in Goldsboro, North Carolina. He attended local segregated schools for African Americans, often underfunded during the Jim Crow years.

On October 14, 1942, the 23-year-old Woodard enlisted in the United States Army at Fort Jackson in Columbia, South Carolina. He served in the Pacific theater in a labor battalion as a longshoreman and was promoted to sergeant. He earned a battle star for his Asiatic–Pacific Campaign Medal by unloading ships under enemy fire in New Guinea, and received the Good Conduct Medal in addition to the American Campaign Medal and World War II Victory Medal awarded to all American service members who served during the war. He received an honorable discharge.

== Attack and maiming ==
On February 12, 1946, Woodard was on a Greyhound Lines bus traveling from Camp Gordon in Augusta, Georgia, where he had been discharged, en route to rejoin his family in North Carolina. When the bus reached a rest stop just outside Augusta, Woodard asked the bus driver if there was time for him to use a toilet. The driver grudgingly acceded to the request after an argument. Woodard returned to his seat from the rest stop without incident, and the bus departed.

The bus stopped in Batesburg (now Batesburg-Leesville, South Carolina), near Aiken. Though Woodard had caused no disruption nor did he start another argument, the driver contacted the local police (including Chief Lynwood Shull), who forcibly removed Woodard from the bus. After demanding to see his discharge papers, a number of Batesburg policemen, including Shull, took Woodard to a nearby alleyway, where they beat him repeatedly with nightsticks. They then took Woodard to the town jail and arrested him for disorderly conduct, accusing him of drinking beer in the back of the bus with other soldiers.

Newspaper accounts vary on what happened next (and accounts sometimes spelled his name as "Woodward"), but author and attorney Michael R. Gardner said in 2003:

In none of the papers is there any suggestion there was verbal or physical violence on the part of Sergeant Woodard. It's quite unclear what really happened. What did happen with certainty is the next morning when the sun came up, Sergeant Isaac Woodard was blind for life.

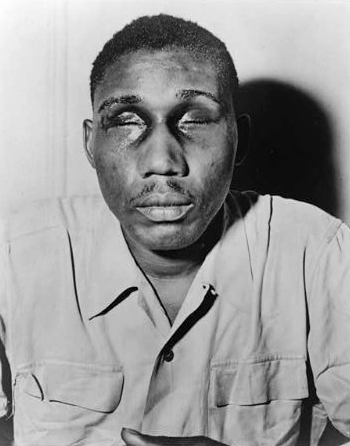
Woodard after being blinded, 1946

During the course of the night in jail, Shull beat and blinded Woodard, who later testified in court that he was beaten for saying "Yes" instead of "Yes, sir". He also had partial amnesia as a result of his injuries. Woodard further testified that the police officers punched him in the eyes several times on the way to the jail, and later repeatedly poked his eyes with a billy club. Although newspaper accounts reported that two policemen allegedly "gouged the youth's eyes out"; historical documents state that their blows had irreparably ruptured each eyeball in its socket.

The following morning, the Batesburg police sent Woodard before the local judge, who found him guilty and fined him fifty dollars. The soldier requested medical assistance, but it took two more days for a doctor to be sent to him. Not knowing where he was and still experiencing amnesia, Woodard ended up in a hospital in Aiken, receiving substandard medical care. Three weeks after he was reported missing by his relatives, Woodard was discovered in the hospital. He was immediately rushed to an Army hospital in Spartanburg. Though his memory had begun to recover by that time, doctors found both eyes were damaged beyond repair.

=== National outcry ===
Woodard with his sister, Eunice Young, July 1946

Although the case was not widely reported at first, it was soon extensively covered in major national newspapers. The National Association for the Advancement of Colored People (NAACP) worked to publicize Woodard's plight, and it also lobbied the state government of South Carolina to address the incident, which it dismissed.

On his ABC radio show Orson Welles Commentaries, actor and filmmaker Orson Welles crusaded for the punishment of Shull and his accomplices. On the broadcast which was made on July 28, 1946, Welles read an affidavit which was sent to him by the NAACP and signed by Woodard. He criticized the lack of action by the South Carolina government as intolerable and shameful. Woodard was the focus of Welles's four subsequent broadcasts. "The NAACP felt that these broadcasts did more than anything else to prompt the Justice Department to act on the case," wrote the Museum of Broadcasting in a 1988 exhibit on Welles.

Musicians wrote songs about Woodard and the attack. A month after the beating, the calypso artist Lord Invader recorded an anti-racism song for his album Calypso at Midnight; it was entitled "God Made Us All", with the last line of the song directly referring to the incident. Later that year, folk artist Woody Guthrie recorded "The Blinding of Isaac Woodard," which he wrote for his album The Great Dust Storm. He said that he wrote the song "...so's you wouldn't be forgetting what happened to this famous Negro soldier less than three hours after he got his Honorable Discharge down in Atlanta...."

=== Federal government's response ===
On September 19, 1946, seven months after the incident, NAACP Executive Secretary Walter Francis White met with President Harry S. Truman in the Oval Office to discuss the Woodard case. Gardner writes that when Truman "heard this story in the context of the state authorities of South Carolina doing nothing for seven months, he exploded." The following day, Truman wrote a letter to Attorney General Tom C. Clark demanding that action be taken to address South Carolina's reluctance to try the case. Six days later, on September 26, Truman directed the Justice Department to open an investigation.

A short investigation followed, and on October 2, Shull and several of his officers were indicted in U.S. District Court in Columbia. It was within federal jurisdiction because the beating had occurred at a bus stop on federal property and at the time Woodard was in uniform of the armed services. The case was presided over by Judge Julius Waties Waring. THe federal case was opened by U.S. Attorney Claud Sapp with an Information instead of following a grand jury indictment; Sapp filed the Information on orders from Turner Smith, the section chief of the United States Department of Justice Civil Rights Division. The Truman administration issued a press release about the filing soon afterward, taking Sapp and local FBI agents by surprise.

By all accounts, the trial was a travesty. Sapp was given little information and little time, and wanted to dismiss the case. He interviewed only the bus driver, a decision that Waring, a civil rights proponent, believed was a gross dereliction of duty. Waring later wrote of being disgusted at the way the case was handled at the local level, commenting, "I was shocked by the hypocrisy of my government ...in submitting that disgraceful case".

The defense did not perform better. When the defense attorney began to shout racial epithets at Woodard, Waring stopped him immediately. During the trial, the defense attorney stated to the all-white jury (blacks were excluded from juries due to disfranchisement of blacks in the South) that "if you rule against Shull, then let this South Carolina secede again." After Woodard gave his account of the events, Shull firmly denied it. He claimed that Woodard had threatened him with a gun and that Shull had used his nightclub in self-defense. During this testimony, Shull admitted that he repeatedly struck Woodard in the eyes.

On November 5, after 30 minutes of deliberation (15, according to at least one news report), the jury found Shull not guilty on all charges, despite his admission that he had blinded Woodard. The courtroom broke into applause upon hearing the verdict. The failure to convict Shull was perceived as a political failure by the Truman administration.

== Later life and death ==
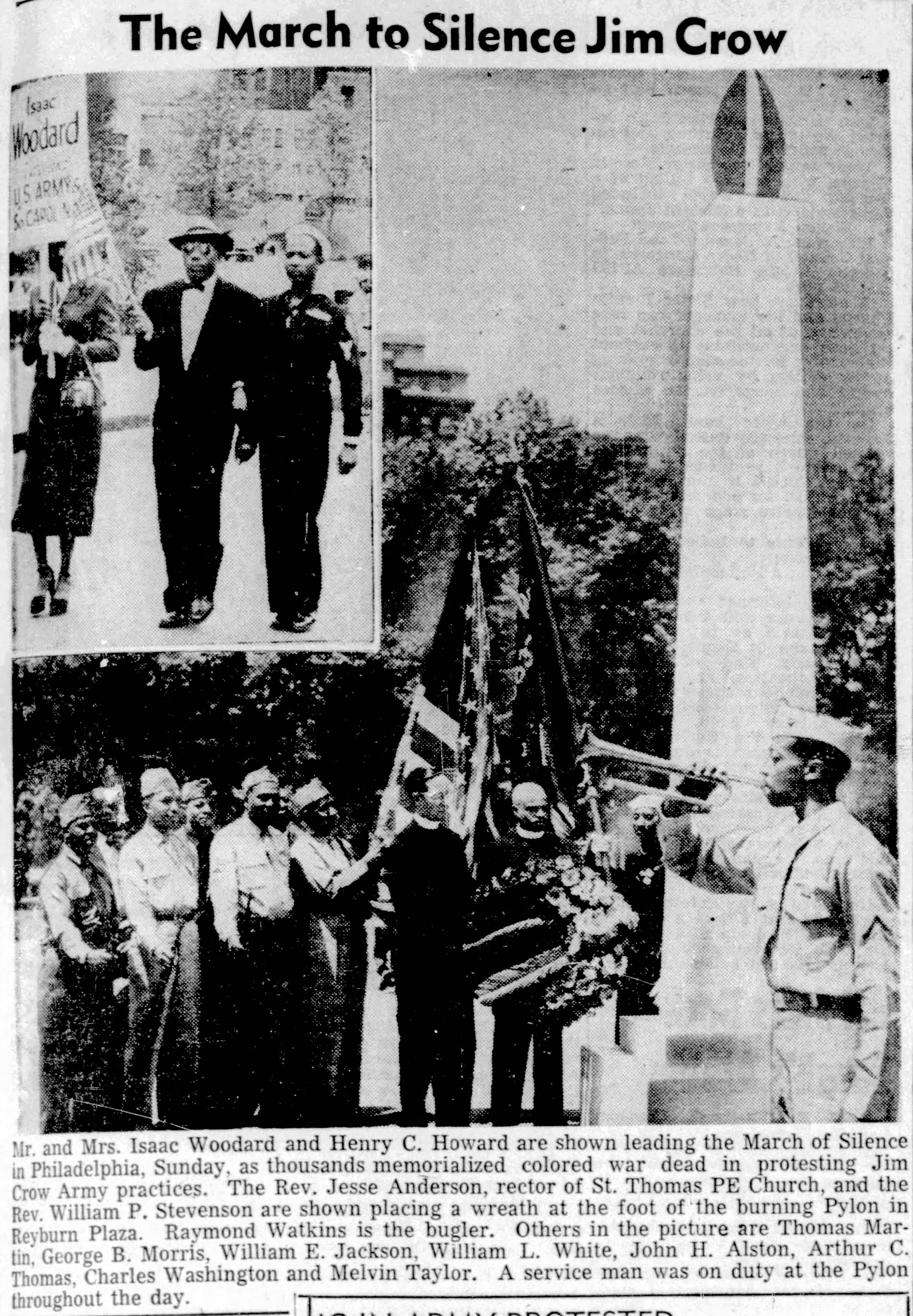
Woodard in The Afro-American, June 10, 1950

Woodard moved north after the trial during the Second Great Migration and lived in the New York City area for the rest of his life. He was politically active for at least a few years after the attack, supporting American Labor Party congressional candidate Leo Isacson and Progressive Party presidential candidate Henry A. Wallace, but withdrew his support for the latter and backed Truman for reelection. He died aged 73 in the Veterans Administration hospital in the Bronx on September 23, 1992. He was buried with military honors at the Calverton National Cemetery (Section 15, Site 2180) in Calverton, New York.

== Legacy ==
=== Influence on American politics ===
In December 1946, after meeting with White and other leaders of the NAACP, and a month after the jury acquitted Shull, Truman established the President's Committee on Civil Rights by Executive Order 9808; a fifteen-member, interracial group, including the President of General Electric, Charles E. Wilson; academics such as John Sloan Dickey from Dartmouth College; and Sadie Tanner Alexander, a black attorney for the city of Philadelphia; and other activists. He asked them to report by the end of 1947.

Truman made a strong speech on civil rights on June 29, 1947, to the NAACP, the first American president to speak to their meeting, which was broadcast by radio from where they met on the steps of the Lincoln Memorial. The President said that civil rights were a moral priority, and it was his priority for the federal government. He had seen by Woodard's and other cases that the issue could not be left to state and local governments. He said:

It is my deep conviction that we have reached a turning point in our country's efforts to guarantee freedom and equality to all our citizens. Recent events in the United States and abroad have made us realize that it is more important today than ever before to ensure that all Americans enjoy these rights. When I say all Americans—I mean all Americans.

On February 2, 1948, Truman sent the first comprehensive civil rights bill to Congress. It incorporated many of the thirty-five recommendations of his commission. In July 1948, over the objection of senior military officers, Truman issued Executive Order 9981, banning racial discrimination in the U.S. Armed Forces, and Executive Order 9980 to integrate the federal government. (Note: Facilities had been segregated under President Woodrow Wilson.) This was in response to a number of incidents against black veterans, most notably the Woodard case. The armed forces and federal agencies led the way in the United States for integration of the workplace, public facilities, and schools. Over the decades, the decision meant that both institutions benefited from the contributions of minorities.

Nevertheless, polls showed opposition to Truman's civil rights efforts. They likely cost him some support in his 1948 reelection bid against Thomas Dewey. Although Truman narrowly won, Gardner believes that his continued championing of civil rights as a federal priority cost him much support, especially in the Solid South. Southern Democrats had long exercised outsize political power in Congress, having disfranchised most blacks there since the turn of the 20th century, but benefiting by apportionment based on total population. Truman's efforts threatened other changes since numerous communities across the country had restrictive covenants that were racially discriminatory. Because of his low approval ratings and because of a bad showing in early primaries, Truman chose not to seek re-election in 1952, though he could have done so. He had been exempted from the term limitations which are imposed by the 22nd amendment.

=== Influence on popular culture ===
Welles revisited the Woodard case on the May 7, 1955, broadcast of his BBC TV series, Orson Welles' Sketch Book. Woody Guthrie later recalled: "I sung 'The Blinding of Isaac Woodard' in the Lewisohn Stadium (in New York City) one night for more than 36,000 people, and I got the loudest applause I've ever got in my whole life."

American: An Odyssey to 1947, a documentary by Danny Wu that looks at the Woodard story through the lens of his family members was released in 2023.

=== Other events ===
Woodard's "drunk and disorderly" conviction was vacated in 2018.

A group of veterans led by Don North, a retired Army major from Carrollton, Georgia, received permission to erect a historical marker in honor of Woodard in Batesburg-Leesville in South Carolina. In 2019 the marker was unveiled. The bottom part of the marker was written in Braille. After a fundraising campaign, this permanent historic plaque now stands on the corner of West Church Street and Fulmer Street in old Batesburg commemorating the civil rights incident at the site of the original police station.

== See also ==
- Booker T. Spicely
- Emmett Till
- George Floyd
- George Stinney
- Harry T. Moore
  - Murder of Harry and Harriette Moore
- Human rights in the United States
- Incarceration in the United States
- Lynching in the United States
  - African-American veterans lynched after World War I
- Medgar Evers
- Military history of African Americans
- Murder of James Byrd Jr.
- Murder of Lemuel Penn
- Ossian Sweet
- Philleo Nash
- Police brutality in the United States
- Race and crime in the United States
- Race in the United States criminal justice system
- Racial bias in criminal news in the United States
- Racial profiling#United States
- Racism against African Americans
- Racism in the United States
- Rodney King
- The Scottsboro Boys
- Use of torture by police in the United States
