= Neverland Firsthand: Investigating the Michael Jackson Documentary =

- Directed by: Eli Pedraza
- Produced by: Liam McEwan
- Starring: Brandi Jackson; Taj Jackson; Liam McEwan; Scott Ross; Brad Sundberg; Charles Thomson
- Distributed by: YouTube
- Release date: March 30, 2019 (United States)
- Country: United States
- Language: English

Neverland Firsthand: Investigating the Michael Jackson Documentary is a documentary produced by Liam McEwan, and directed by Eli Pedraza, which explores the allegations of child sexual abuse against singer Michael Jackson by Wade Robson and James Safechuck in the HBO documentary Leaving Neverland. The documentary presents interviews with individuals described as having been omitted from HBO's work, who counter the version of events presented in that work.

== History ==
Shortly after the release of Leaving Neverland, Michael Jackson's nephew, Taj Jackson, became determined to counter the allegations made against his uncle. The project was released in March 2019, approximately two months after Leaving Neverland. Director Liam McEwan recounted that the first time he heard of Robson and Safechuck was when they filed lawsuits that were ultimately thrown out of court, prompting him to further investigate their claims. McEwan further confirmed that the Jackson family did not pay him to create the film.

== Synopsis ==
Neverland Firsthand makes the case that the HBO documentary Leaving Neverland, which claims that Michael Jackson sexually abused Wade Robson and James Safechuck when they were children, is flawed. The documentary features Jackson's nephew Taj Jackson, Jackson's niece Brandi Jackson, private investigator Scott Ross, technical director Brad Sundberg, and investigative journalist Charles Thomson.

The documentary provides information described as having been "excluded from HBO's broadcast", on the grounds that it discredits claims made in Leaving Neverland. Sundberg, who worked with Jackson on the Neverland Ranch and in other locations stated in his interview for the film that he never saw "a child around Michael Jackson that looked like they had been distressed, hurt, abused". Brandi Jackson specifically addressed accusations made by Robson, stating that she and Robson had previously been in a relationship, and that she had found him to be "a bit of an opportunist" positioning himself for financial gain.

Another point investigated by the documentary is an assertion that Safechuck's allegations against Jackson included material "taken from a fictional book released in the 1990s about a child being molested by Jackson". McEwan also noted that Safechuck claimed that Jackson had wanted him to testify in Jackson's 2005 trial, and Safechuck had refused; McEwan interviewed a private investigator who worked on that trial, who stated that Safechuck was never asked to testify at all, because the judge had barred the introduction of such evidence.

== Media coverage ==
Within the first few days of release, Neverland Firsthand made international headlines, being picked up by Vanity Fair, Billboard, Rolling Stone, and Cosmopolitan, as well as being featured in news broadcasts across Italy, Mexico, France, Australia, and South Africa.

== See also ==
- Square One: Michael Jackson
- Michael Jackson: Chase the Truth
