= The Truth vs. Alex Jones =

- Official poster
- Directed by: Dan Reed
- Produced by: Dan Reed; Marguerite Gaudin
- Edited by: Peter Haddon; Will Grayburn
- Music by: David Schweitzer
- Production companies: HBO Documentary Films; Amos Pictures
- Distributed by: HBO
- Release dates: March 11, 2024 (SXSW); March 26, 2024 (United States)
- Running time: 121 minutes
- Country: United States
- Language: English

The Truth vs. Alex Jones is a 2024 American documentary film, directed and produced by Dan Reed. It follows families of victims of the Sandy Hook Elementary School shooting, taking radio show host and conspiracy theorist Alex Jones to court for spreading lies about the shooting.

It had its world premiere at South by Southwest on March 11, 2024, and was released on March 26, 2024, by HBO. The film won a Peabody Award at the 85th Annual Ceremony.

== Premise ==
Families of victims from the Sandy Hook Elementary School shooting take InfoWars radio host Alex Jones to court for spreading conspiracies and lies.

== Production ==
Dan Reed received exclusive access to the courtroom of the trial of Alex Jones, after the judge permitted cameras and microphones. Reed attempted to interview Jones for the film, who declined. However, Jones would turn to the cameras and wink or smile, which Reed found strange.

== Release ==
It had its world premiere at South by Southwest on March 11, 2024. It was released on HBO and Max on March 26, 2024.

== Reception ==
On the review aggregator website Rotten Tomatoes, 100% of 24 critics' reviews are positive, with an average rating of 8.3/10. Metacritic, which uses a weighted average, assigned the film a score of 86 out of 100, based on 5 critics, indicating "universal acclaim".

The Daily Telegraph's Anita Singh wrote, "What the families' lawyers – and this documentary – did so effectively was to show that Jones believes none of this and is simply out for financial gain. He knows that putting out garbage on his channel... brings online traffic and a resulting uptick in sales for the vitamin supplements he flogs", and gave the film 4/5 stars. Lucy Mangan of The Guardian also gave it 4/5 stars, writing, "The madness of it, and the knowledge that Jones's rants are giving a certain rabid demographic exactly what they want, the dizzying sense of unreality and the multiplying questions as you watch – about how and why any of this can possibly be – fries your circuits even at this remove of time and space."

Brian Tallerico of RogerEbert.com gave the film 3.5 stars out of 4, writing: "Sharply edited, sensitively constructed, and expertly crafted. It's a reminder of how to tell this story well in a documentary film instead of dragging it out for the common docuseries trend." Fletcher Peters of The Daily Beast called it "A scathing portrait of Jones and the vile misinformation he spread about the Sandy Hook tragedy." The New Zealand Herald's Jen Shieff gave it 5 out of 5 stars, saying, "Director Dan Reed also made Leaving Neverland (2019), about Michael Jackson. In both documentaries he’s unflinching, here selecting footage of Alex Jones spitting his invective about the deep state on Texas-based media platform Infowars, owned by his company Free Speech Systems."

== See also ==
Other documentaries that also featured Alex Jones:

- Feels Good Man
- New World Order
