= Chloe Franks =

British actress

Chloe Franks (born 1 September 1963) is a British actress, best known for her roles as a child actress in British films during the 1970s. She was born in London, England.

== Career ==
Her most memorable role was as Jane Reid, the young, witchcraft-obsessed daughter of Christopher Lee in the Amicus horror anthology film The House That Dripped Blood (1970). She also portrayed Katy Coombs in Whoever Slew Auntie Roo? (1971), alongside Shelley Winters, who played Aunt Roo, and Mark Lester, who played her brother, Christopher. Additionally, she appeared as Fredericka Armfeldt, the daughter of Desiree Armfeldt (played by Elizabeth Taylor) in the Oscar-winning musical A Little Night Music.

== Filmography ==
=== Film ===
Year	Title	Role	Notes
1970	Trog	Little Girl	
1970	All the Right Noises	Jenny	
1971	The House That Dripped Blood	Jane	
1971	I, Monster	Girl in Alley	Uncredited
1971	Straw Dogs	Emma Hebden	Uncredited
1972	Whoever Slew Auntie Roo?	Katy Coombs	
1972	Tales from the Crypt	Carol	
1976	The Littlest Horse Thieves	Alice Sandman	
1976	The Deadly Females	Child	
1977	The Uncanny	Angela	
1977	A Little Night Music	Fredericka Armfeldt	
1981	The Island of Adventure	Dinah Mannering	

=== Television ===
Year	Title	Role	Notes
1971	Man at the Top	Monica Binsey	Episode: "Too Good for This World"
1971	The Persuaders!	Pullicino's Daughter	Episode: "The Gold Napoleon"
1973	Follyfoot	Angela	Episode: "Uncle Joe"
1974	John Halifax, Gentleman	Muriel	Episode #1.3
1974	Heidi	Clara	4 episodes
1975	The Main Chance	Liz	Episode: "Killing"
1978	Kilvert's Diary	Florence Hill	Episode: "Ten Miles for a Kiss"
1981	BBC2 Playhouse	Laura Fielding	Episode: "Last Summer's Child"
1982	Ivanhoe	Attendant	Television film
1982	Frost in May	Hilary	Episode: "Frost in May"
1983	Death of an Expert Witness	Brenda Pridmore	6 episodes
