= What the Peeper Saw =

1972 film by James Kelley

- US theatrical release poster
- Directed by: James Kelley; Andrea Bianchi (Note: James Kelly is credited as director on English language versions of the film, while Andrea Bianchi is credited on non-English language versions.)
- Screenplay by: Trevor Preston
- Produced by: Graham Harris
- Starring: Mark Lester; Britt Ekland; Hardy Kruger; Lilli Palmer; Harry Andrews
- Cinematography: Harry Waxman; Luis Cuadrado
- Edited by: Nicholas Wentworth
- Music by: Stelvio Cipriani
- Production companies: Leander Films; Leisure Media
- Distributed by: Avco Embassy Pictures (United States); Leander Films (United Kingdom); Cineteca (Spain); Indipendenti Regionali (Italy); MGM (West Germany)
- Release dates: 14 October 1972 (Italy); 26 November 1972 (United Kingdom); 6 February 1973 (West Germany)
- Running time: 95 minutes
- Countries: United Kingdom; Spain; Italy; West Germany
- Languages: English; Italian

What the Peeper Saw (Note: Spanish: Diabólica malicia, lit. 'Diabolical Malice'; Italian: La tua presenza nuda!, lit. 'Your Naked Presence!'; French: Les Émotions d'un jeune voyeur, lit. 'The Emotions of a Young Voyeur'; French: L'Enfant de la nuit, lit. 'The Child of the Night'; German: Diabolisch, lit. 'Diabolical'; German: Der Zeuge hinter der Wand, lit. 'The Witness Behind the Wall') (also known as Night Hair Child) is a 1972 psychological thriller film directed by James Kelley and Andrea Bianchi from a screenplay by Trevor Preston, and starring Mark Lester, Britt Ekland, Hardy Krüger, Lilli Palmer and Harry Andrews. In the film, the new wife (Ekland) of a successful writer (Krüger) suspects that her 12-year-old stepson (Lester) may have had a hand in his mother's mysterious death. It is an international co-production of the United Kingdom, Spain, Italy and West Germany.

== Plot ==
Two years after his wife Sarah dies mysteriously while taking a bath, 42-year-old Paul, a successful writer, lives with his 22-year-old second wife Elise in an isolated mansion in rural Andalusia. Three months into their marriage, Elise meets Paul's precocious 12-year-old son Marcus for the first time after he returns home from boarding school while Paul is on a business trip to Paris. Marcus explains that he borrowed 1,000 pesetas from his father's desk to pay for a taxi from the airport. While Elise is talking to Paul on the phone, Marcus fondles Elise's breasts, which makes her uncomfortable.

Paul returns from Paris and asks if Elise took money from his desk. She mentions that Marcus borrowed money for the taxi ride home. Marcus now claims that he took 300 pesetas. Elise disputes Marcus's claim, but Paul lets the matter slide. Searching Marcus's room for the stolen money, Elise finds the torn pieces of a letter he received earlier from school. She visits Marcus's boarding school in England and talks to the headmaster, who wrote Paul a letter explaining Marcus's situation, and reveals that Marcus was expelled for spying on couples, making lewd drawings, and torturing and killing a cat.

When Paul takes Elise to a house party, the hostess, Sophie, tells Elise that Sarah, who was her friend, had died in her bathroom. Elise later confronts Paul, who admits that he sold his house to Sophie after Sarah's death. He tells Elise that Sarah died from a heart attack while she was taking a bath. Elise reveals that she knows that Marcus was expelled from school. Paul reassures Elise that Marcus needs more time and love.

Elise meets with Sophie, who explains that Sarah kept her heart condition a secret and was electrocuted due to an electric heater beside the bathtub. Elise again confronts Paul, who resents her growing suspicion. Before Paul's departure to Paris, a drunk Elise taunts Marcus and calls him a "freak", to which Marcus responds that he laughed when his mother died. She tries to reconcile with Paul, but he rebuffs her and leaves for the airport.

Noticing a hole in her bedroom ceiling, Elise runs up to the attic and finds that a hole was dug underneath the floorboards. She rushes to Marcus's bedroom and accuses him of spying on her and Paul. She then demands the truth about Sarah's death. Marcus agrees to answer, only if Elise offers herself to him. Elise reluctantly strips naked while asking Marcus questions about Sarah's death. Marcus eventually admits to murdering Sarah, but Elise rebuffs his claims and storms off.

When Paul returns from Paris, Elise takes him to the attic, but the hole has been filled in. Days later, Paul and Marcus find their family dog floating dead in the pool. Elise visits the family psychiatrist, Dr. Viorne, who questions her about the discoveries and accusations against Marcus. Viorne asks why Elise stripped naked in front of Marcus and asks if she harmed his dog. Elise frantically insists that Marcus made her strip in exchange of information about Sarah and proclaims that he murdered his mother.

Elise attempts to smother Marcus with a pillow, but Paul intervenes. Elise is committed to a psychiatric hospital, where she is given sedatives. She starts having nightmares of killing Marcus, being attacked by the family dog, and having sex with Marcus while Paul watches on. After Elise is released, she and Paul reconcile. He tells her that he sold the house as he wanted a fresh start with her and Marcus. Marcus introduces his new dog, Hannibal, to Elise.

Elise and Marcus take Hannibal for a walk. While alone with Elise, Marcus suggests murdering Paul so they can be together. Elise agrees and they kiss. While walking through a park, they come across a road where Elise notices a car coming up at a high speed. She throws a ball across the road for Hannibal to retrieve. Marcus chases after the dog, only to be run over by the car, killing him. Elise walks away as a crowd gathers around Marcus's dead body.

== Cast ==
- Mark Lester as Marcus
- Britt Ekland as Elise
- Hardy Krüger as Paul
- Lilli Palmer as Dr. Viorne
- Harry Andrews as headmaster
- Conchita Montes as Sophie
- Collette Jack as Sarah

== Release ==
What the Peeper Saw was released in Italy on 14 October 1972 by Indipendenti Regionali as La tua presenza nuda!, in the United Kingdom on 26 November 1972 by Leander Films as Night Hair Child, and in West Germany on 7 February 1973 by MGM as Diabolisch or Der Zeuge hinter der Wand. The film was released in Spain by Cineteca as Diabólica malicia and in France as Les Emotions d'un jeune voyeur or L'Enfant de la nuit.

== Reception ==
The Monthly Film Bulletin wrote: "The action proceeds uneasily from one voyeuristic encounter to another, and the script is so poorly constructed that it takes the heroine an hour to discover what has been shown to the audience in the film's first few minutes. Despite brief glimpses of Lilli Palmer as a psychiatrist, the psychodynamics of the situation are barely explored, and the audience is basically required to accept that Marcus has somehow become a fully developed psychopath without exhibiting any symptoms at all to his unsuspecting parents. Many of the dialogue exchanges between husband and wife sound as if they were being read from a teleprompter, and the director occasionally removes the sound altogether and complements their lip movements with the incongruously breezy musical score. Only Harry Andrews' appearance as a headmaster in the brief English sequences provides welcome relief from the unlikely family constellation which the film pretends to examine."
