= Square One: Michael Jackson =

2019 documentary film by Danny Wu

Square One
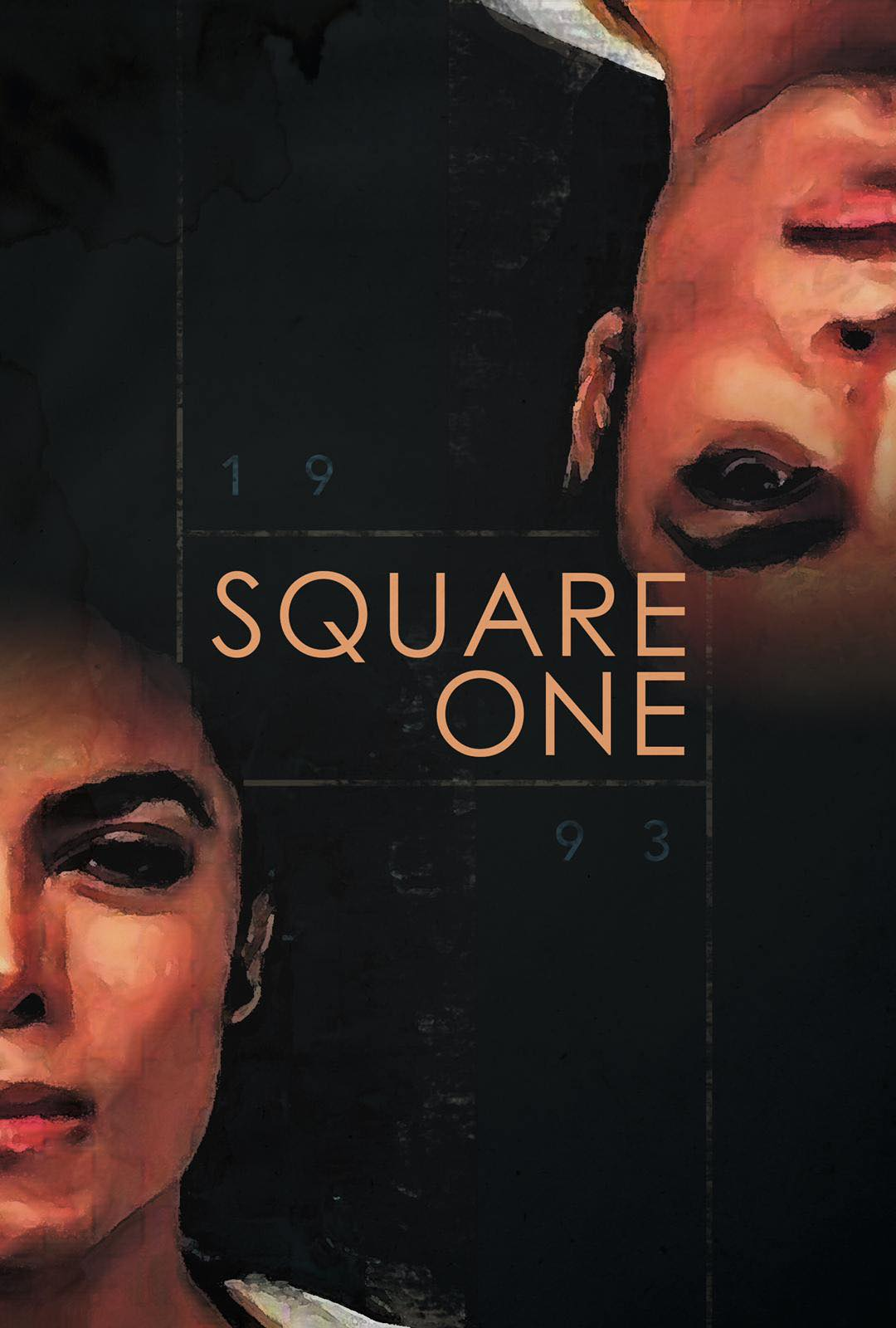
- Promotional poster
- Directed by: Danny Wu
- Written by: Danny Wu; Shania Kumar
- Produced by: Danny Wu
- Starring: Danny Wu; Charles Thomson; Taj Jackson; Geraldine Hughes; Jenny Winings; Caroline Fristedt; Josephine Zohny
- Release date: September 28, 2019
- Running time: 83 minutes

Square One: Michael Jackson is a 2019 documentary directed by Danny Wu about the 1993 child sexual abuse accusations against the American singer Michael Jackson. Through interviews, the film makes a case for Jackson's innocence. The interviews showcase statements from trial witnesses, Jackson's nephew, and legal assistant to attorney Barry Rothman in 1993.

== Synopsis ==
The film features interviews with Jackson's nephew Taj Jackson; three women who were on the 2003 witness list in People v. Jackson; a legal secretary to Barry Rothman, Geraldine Hughes; and the journalist Charles Thomson. It makes a case for Jackson's innocence, portraying him as a victim of tabloid journalism.

== Release ==
Square One was released at TCL Chinese Theater on September 28, 2019, with people close to Jackson and others in attendance. On October 5, 2019, the film premiered in London and was launched on YouTube. In early November 2019, Danny Wu embarked on a multi-city tour in China, premiering the film in Beijing, Zhengzhou, Shenzhen, Kunming, Wunan, Shanghai, and Wu's birthplace of Chengdu. The film had its European premiere in Amsterdam on January 18, 2020. Square One was made available in an enhanced version on Amazon Prime Video on May 7, 2020, in the US and the UK and worldwide on June 12.

== Reception ==
In January 2020, the Belgian public broadcaster RTBF published an analysis of the film as part of a one-year retrospective on Leaving Neverland. The network described Danny Wu's work as a counter-documentary focused on the original 1993 investigation, noting its inclusion of phone conversations involving the Chandler family and highlighting the film's perspective regarding an alleged financial extortion setup by Jordan Chandler's father. The same year, the news network Scripps News broadcast an interview with director Danny Wu defending his investigative work.

In a 2022 study published in the American Behavioral Scientist, fan-driven counter-narratives produced to defend Michael Jackson after Leaving Neverland are analyzed, using Square One as a case study. The author notes that the film explicitly attempts to reverse the narrative of the HBO documentary by focusing on the 1993 allegations, arguing that Jackson's accusers exploited his naivety and used the initial case as a template for present strategies. The study highlights specific production choices made in Square One to build credibility and perform transparency, such as placing director Danny Wu at the center of the narrative to document his process. The author analyzes the film's structural and aesthetic choices, noting glossy imagery, an emotional score, and interviews with family members, fans who lived at Neverland, and people claiming to have heard accusers confess to making false statements. While distinguishing Square One from amateur internet videos due to its commercial distribution on Amazon and mainstream media coverage, the author argues that these works serve to stage a "public trial" and characterizes them as "conspiracy documentaries" designed to discredit the accusers and assert the artist's innocence.

In 2025, the scholarly monograph Michael Jackson's Radical Aesthetic drew on the documentary to analyze Josephine Zohny's testimony regarding Jordan Chandler's time at New York University in the early 2000s. The author examines the film's account of Chandler allegedly making spontaneous statements in support of Jackson during student debates surrounding the 2003 broadcast of Living with Michael Jackson, while also discussing the documentary's perspective on potential family coercion in relation to Evan Chandler's 1993 actions.

In 2026, the Indian edition of Esquire magazine, as well as Capricho magazine, listed Square One as an essential documentary for understanding the complexities of the legal proceedings involving the singer.

== See also ==
- 1993 child sexual abuse accusations against Michael Jackson
- Leaving Neverland
- Michael Jackson: Chase the Truth
- Neverland Firsthand: Investigating the Michael Jackson Documentary
