= Whoever Slew Auntie Roo? =

1971 film by Curtis Harrington

- US theatrical release poster
- Directed by: Curtis Harrington
- Screenplay by: Robert Blees; Jimmy Sangster; Gavin Lambert
- Story by: David D. Osborn
- Produced by: James H. Nicholson; Samuel Z. Arkoff
- Starring: Shelley Winters; Mark Lester; Ralph Richardson; Judy Cornwell; Michael Gothard; Hugh Griffith; Lionel Jeffries
- Cinematography: Desmond Dickinson
- Edited by: Tristram Cones
- Music by: Kenneth V. Jones
- Production companies: AIP-England, Ltd.; Hemdale
- Distributed by: MGM-EMI Distributors (UK)
- Release dates: 22 December 1971 (US); 11 February 1972 (UK)
- Running time: 91 minutes
- Country: United Kingdom
- Language: English
- Budget: $800,000

Whoever Slew Auntie Roo? (released in the United States as Who Slew Auntie Roo?) is a 1971 British horror thriller film directed by Curtis Harrington and starring Shelley Winters, Mark Lester, Ralph Richardson, Chloe Franks, Judy Cornwell, Michael Gothard, Hugh Griffith and Lionel Jeffries. Inspired by the fairy tale "Hansel and Gretel", the film focuses on a demented American widow (Winters) living in her husband's English manor who becomes obsessed with a young orphan girl who resembles her dead daughter.

The film was co-produced by American International Pictures's British branch and Hemdale Film Corporation, and filmed at Shepperton Studios in London. It is considered part of the psycho-biddy subgenre of the 1960s and early 1970s. Director Harrington and star Winters had previously made the psycho-biddy film What's the Matter with Helen? earlier in 1971.

Whoever Slew Auntie Roo? premiered in the United States before being released in Britain on 11 February 1972. It received mixed-to-positive reviews from critics.

== Plot ==
Every year, Rosie Forrest, known as "Auntie Roo", throws a lavish overnight Christmas party for ten of the best-mannered children at the local orphanage. Despite her warm demeanour, Rosie is in fact demented and mentally ill and keeps the mummified remains of her daughter Katharine in a nursery room in the attic. She holds regular séances in hopes of communicating with her spirit, presided over by phony medium Mr. Benton, who splits his fees with the butler Albie in return for setting up their lucrative deception, which is also participated in by Clarine the maid, who calls down the dumbwaiter shaft in a childlike voice pretending to be the deceased Katharine.

Christopher and Katy Coombs, an orphaned brother and sister, sneak into the party. Auntie Roo notices that Katy resembles her late daughter and warmly welcomes her and her brother. After the party ends, Auntie Roo kidnaps Katy with the intention of making her a substitute for Katherine. Christopher believes Auntie Roo is a witch who wants to devour him and his sister. He tries to warn people about Auntie Roo, and when no one believes him he returns to the house alone to rescue his sister.

Auntie Roo prepares a dinner for the coming New Year while Christopher assists her by gathering firewood. In the process, he steals the key to the nursery room and lets Katy out. Earlier, they had stolen Auntie Roo's jewelry and stuffed it inside an old teddy bear that once belonged to Katharine. Christopher and Katy try to escape through the basement kitchen door but Auntie Roo manages to lock them in the pantry. Then she starts thinking about her dead daughter and returns to the nursery to visit with Katharine’s corpse. This time when she attempts to remove the mummy from its coffin, its skull crumbles into dust in her hands. Traumatized and rapidly losing what little sanity she has left, she returns to the kitchen and tries to focus on preparing her New Year’s Eve dinner. Hearing her return, Christopher tells Katy to call to her in the same manner as Clarine did during the séance, which he had overheard during the night of the Christmas party. That gets Auntie Roo’s attention and she opens the door of the pantry and walks inside looking for them. Christopher is hiding on the top shelf and pushes a bunch of cans on top of her, knocking her to the floor, and he and Katy manage to get out of the pantry and lock Auntie Roo inside. They then place the firewood at the pantry door, soak it with paraffin, and set it on fire. After retrieving the teddy bear with the jewels from the nursery, they then escape from the mansion.

Outside the mansion the orphans encounter Auntie Roo's butcher, Mr. Harrison, who is delivering a whole piglet by horsecart. He sees the smoke inside and drives off to call the fire brigade. Katy realizes that Auntie Roo was to cook the pig, but Christopher says that they were to be eaten after it. The fire brigade arrives and puts out the fire but are unable to rescue Auntie Roo. Inspector Willoughby takes the children back to the orphanage. Christopher and Katy smile at each other as they depart from the burned mansion, knowing that Auntie Roo will not harm anyone else and that they can use her jewelry (which Christopher calls "the wicked witch's treasure") to ensure their own happy ending.

== Cast ==
- Shelley Winters as Rosie "Auntie Roo" Forrest
- Mark Lester as Christopher Coombs
- Chloe Franks as Katy Coombs
- Ralph Richardson as Mr. Benton
- Lionel Jeffries as Police Inspector Willoughby
- Hugh Griffith as Mr. Harrison, the "Pigman"
- Rosalie Crutchley as Miss Henley
- Pat Heywood as Dr. Mason
- Judy Cornwell as Clarine, Aunt Roo's maid
- Michael Gothard as Albie, Aunt Roo's butler
- Jacqueline Cowper as Angela, girl at orphanage
- Richard Beaumont as Peter, boy at orphanage
- Charlotte Sayce as Katharine Forrest, Auntie Roo's daughter
- Marianne Stone as Miss Wilcox

== Production ==
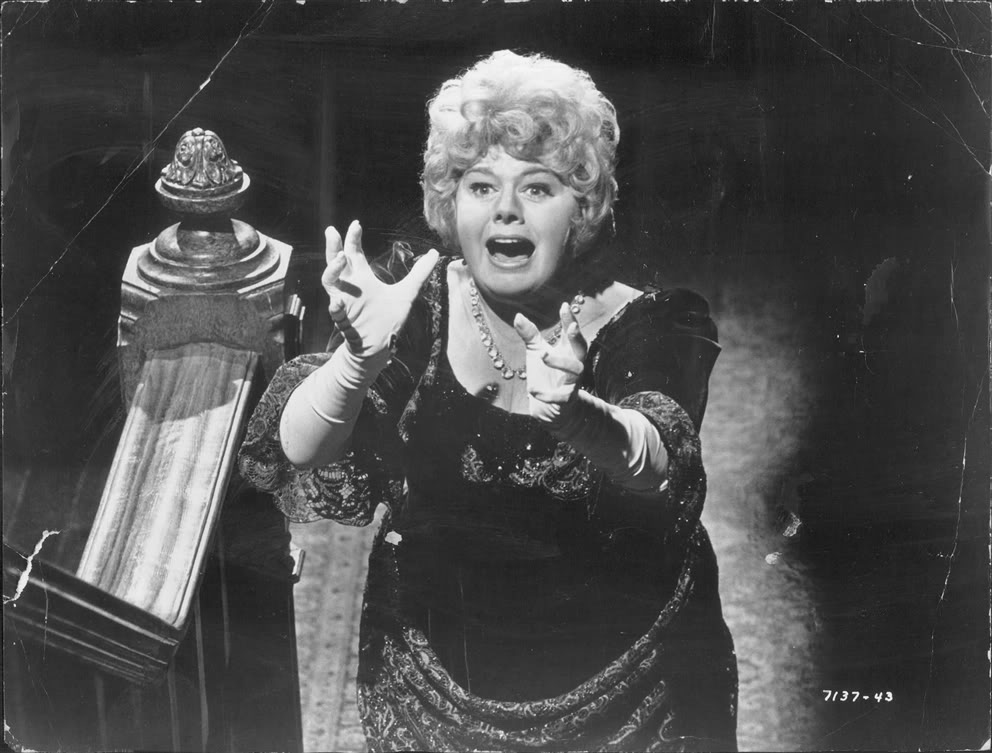
Shelley Winters as Rosie Forrest ("Auntie Roo")

=== Development ===
The film was financed by American International Pictures (AIP) through its British subdivision AIP-England, Ltd. and Hemdale Film Corporation, who represented Mark Lester. It was one of three films financed by Hemdale (the others were Where Does It Hurt? and Love on Horseback) with a total budget of £1,250,000.

Curtis Harrington was going to direct Wuthering Heights in England for AIP, but did this instead after Shelley Winters requested him. Winters had worked with Harrington on What's the Matter with Helen? and asked for him on this movie "because of his ability with actors. I thought he would be wonderful." Harrington recalled it was not a project "I personally wanted particularly to do."

=== Writing ===
The film was based on a storyline from longtime Hammer horror writer Jimmy Sangster, inspired by Hansel and Gretel. AIP chiefs Samuel Z. Arkoff and James H. Nicholson hired Robert Blees to re-write the script. Dissatisfied with Blees' work, Harrington arranged to have the script rewritten again by Gavin Lambert, who was credited with 'additional dialogue'.

Even after this, Harrington said "It had a very weak, incredibly lousy script... what I finally shot is an incredible improvement over the original. Even so, it was very difficult to do enough with it to make it work."

Harrington says it was his idea to set the film in the 1920s, recalling: "I have a great fondness for all the imagery and quality of the traditional Victorian Christmas celebration. I tried to put as much as I could of that in the film."

The working title of the film was The Gingerbread House, which Harrington's preferred, but it was to be changed due to its similarities to the Neil Simon play, The Gingerbread Lady. At one stage, the film was called The Best of Friends.

=== Casting ===
Ralph Richardson was suggested to Harrington by AIP producer Louis M. Heyward. Harrington says the only actor the producers "imposed on me" was Michael Gothard, who he called a "lousy actor" and "a pain in the arse."

Harrington felt Mark Lester was not interested in acting but the director enjoyed working with Chloe Franks.

=== Filming ===
Filming was going to commence on 30 November 1970 but then was pushed back until April 1971. It mostly took place at Shepperton Studios.

== Release ==
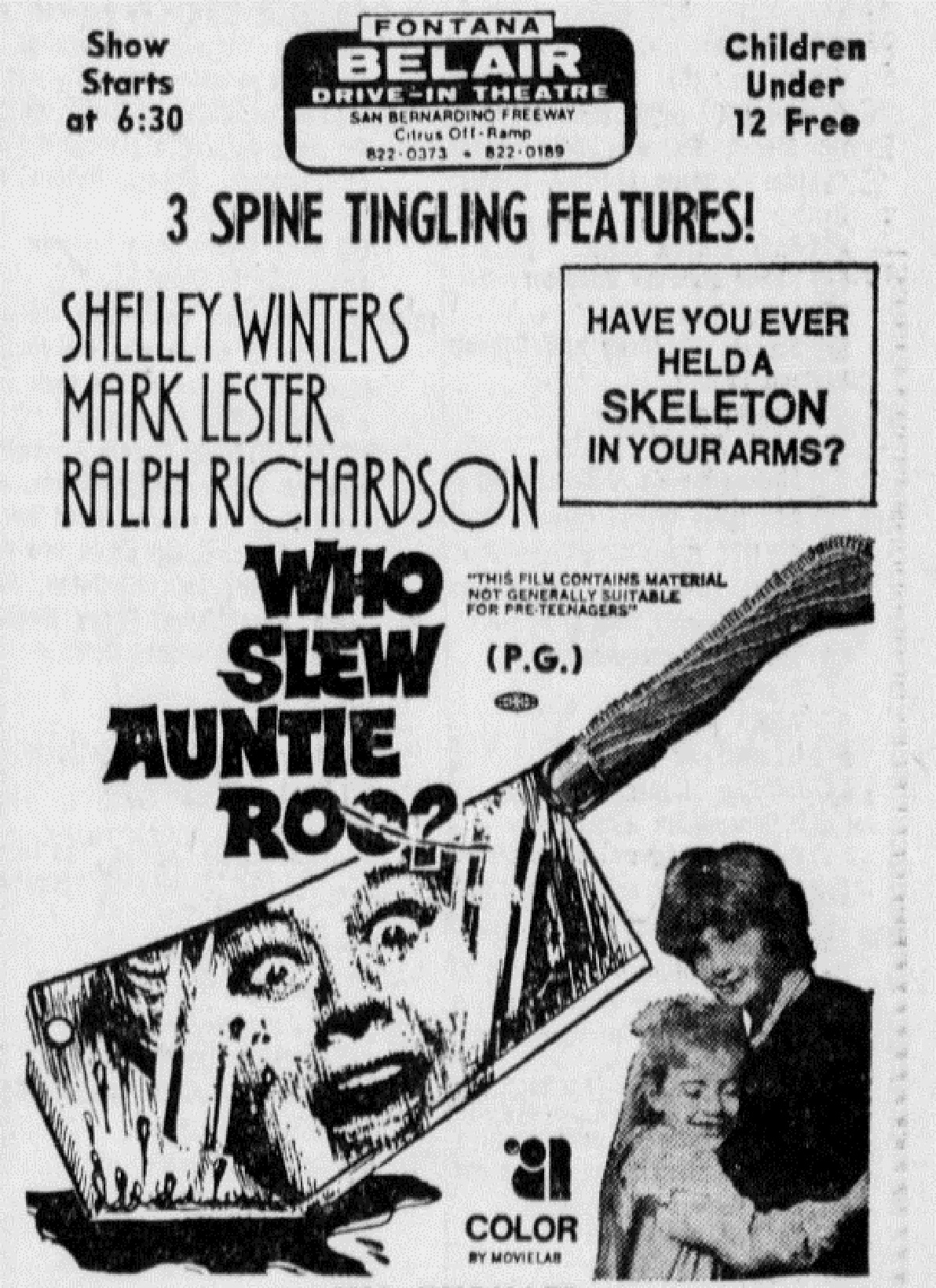
Drive-in advertisement from 1972

Whoever Slew Auntie Roo? was released theatrically in the United States by AIP in late 1971, opening regionally in several cities in Ohio and Pennsylvania on 22 December 1971. It was released in the UK by MGM-EMI Distributors on 11 February of the following year.

== Reception ==
=== Critical response ===
On Rotten Tomatoes, the film holds an approval rating of 60% based on 10 reviews, with a weighted average rating of 4.8/10.

Variety said "script is overly-contrived, but carries certain element of interest that may see it through selected bookings."

Craig Butler from Allmovie wrote, "If one is in the right frame of mind, Who Slew Auntie Roo? can be a lot of ghoulish fun. It's not good, mind you; as a matter of fact, Roo is basically trash. But it's campy and silly and just the ticket if you're in the mood for a film that makes you groan at its inanity as often as it makes you shiver." TV Guide awarded the film 2/5 stars and stated that the film "walks a fine line between good and bad taste, manipulating audience expectations and loyalties gleefully and shamelessly."

The Terror Trap gave the film 3 out of 4 stars, writing, "A nice retelling of the classic fairy tale Hansel and Gretel (with Winters clearly delighting in the devilish role), this is lovingly directed by genre regular Curtis Harrington."

On his website Fantastic Movie Musings and Ramblings, Dave Sindelar stated that the film "never really becomes either a full-blooded horror movie or an effective variation on the fairy tale. The scare scenes would be more effective if they didn’t seem so arbitrary, and the last third of the movie fails to build up the necessary tension or suspense."

=== Creators' response ===
Harrington called it "just a rather thin little fable. I found Shelley Winters' mad behavior vastly amusing... I do feel that I had achieved the pathos of the situation at the end... I still think that whatever flaws it had, it turned out astonishingly well, considering that it was a terrible uphill struggle for me all the way."

Winters said, "If they’d had a bigger budget and released it differently, things would have been a lot different for him and me. They didn’t release it like an A-picture and they should have. We had a great deal of fun rehearsing. Ralph Richardson was great in it. But they released it like a spooky, spooky picture and they shouldn’t have."

== See also ==
- Christmas horror
- Psycho-biddy
- What's the Matter with Helen? (1971)

== Notes ==
- Harrington, Curtis (2013). Nice Guys Don't Work in Hollywood : The Adventures of An Aesthete in the Movie Business. Drag City. ISBN 978-1-937112-07-3.
