= American: An Odyssey to 1947 =

2022 Canadian documentary film

- Official Poster for American: An Odyssey to 1947
- Directed by: Danny Wu
- Written by: Danny Wu
- Produced by: Danny Wu
- Starring: Simon Callow; Richard France; Howard Kakita; Gray Brechin; Laura Williams; James Naremore
- Edited by: Danny Wu
- Music by: Sean William
- Production company: Maple Road Pictures
- Release date: 2022
- Running time: 102 minutes
- Country: Canada

American: An Odyssey to 1947 is a 2022 Canadian documentary film written, directed, edited, and produced by Danny Wu. The film is a compilation of stories on different Americans, most notably Orson Welles, and Franklin Roosevelt leading to the year 1947. The film premiered at the 2022 Newport Beach Film festival, followed by internationally at the 2023 Thessaloniki Documentary Festival. It was named one of film critic Jonathan Rosenbaum's best films of 2022.

== Synopsis ==
The film begins by exploring the early rise of Orson Welles, from his rise as a prodigy at the Todd School for Boys, to his arrival in Hollywood to direct Citizen Kane. Welles' ascension to stardom is juxtaposed with President Roosevelt's navigation of the Great Depression. As the story approaches World War II, a Japanese American boy named Howard Kakita travels abroad, and an African American soldier named Isaac Woodard enlists in the army. The film explores topics such as the Japanese internment camp, the Atomic bombing of Hiroshima, the emergence of the Civil rights movement, and the beginnings of the Cold War. In the end, as one American returns home, another American is forced to exile.

== Production ==
On November 10, 2021, it was reported that Canadian director Danny Wu would produce a new documentary to be about the politics of Orson Welles, with actor Simon Callow as one of the main storytellers, and that the relatives of Isaac Woodard would also appear in the film. UC Berkeley announced on October 22, 2022, that historian Gray Brechin will also be included in the film's storytellers.

== Release ==
On October 20, 2022, American premiered at the Newport Beach Film Festival. 10 days later, the film premiered at the Austin film festival where it was nominated for the grand jury award for "Best Documentary." On March 5, 2023, the film made their International premiere at the 25th Thessaloniki Documentary Festival, and soon after in Brazil at the It's All True International Documentary Festival in April. In August 2023, Gravitas Ventures acquired the North American distribution rights for a Sept 12 release. On September 26, 2024, the film held a special screening at the Truman Presidential Library.

== Reception ==
American: An Odyssey to 1947 has received positive reviews from critics. James Verniere of the Boston Herald called it a "valuable odyssey" that often notes cases of "intersection and symmetry". Tony Williams called it a “remarkable film” that “deserves distribution and future screenings in any respectable film class.” David Sterritt called it "a completely absorbing documentary". Leda Galanou for Flix reviewed the film as having "surprising depth" and showed "how parallel lives can shape each other without people ever meeting. " Andreas Kyrkos for I Avgi called the film "superbly crafted", and that it "respectfully and historically accurately investigates the hidden events of the 1940s." Jonathan Rosenbaum listed the film on his year end list for the "best films of 2022." Chuck Braverman put the film on his "best of 2023" list.
