= The Devil's Best Trick =

2024 book by Randall Sullivan

- Author: Randall Sullivan
- Cover artist: Jacket design: Becca Fox Design. Jacket artwork: "Milton's Paradise Lost" by Gustave Doré from Book IX Lines 182-183 in 1866 retrieved via Getty Images.
- Language: English
- Subject: Existence of the devil
- Genre: Nonfiction
- Publisher: Grove Press, an imprint of Grove Atlantic
- Publication date: May 2024
- Publication place: 154 West 14th Street New York, NY 10011, United States
- Media type: Print
- Pages: 352
- ISBN: 978-0802119131
- OCLC: 1431973761
- Dewey Decimal: 235/.47
- LC Class: 2023056568

The Devil's Best Trick: How the Face of Evil Disappeared is a nonfiction book by Randall Sullivan that was first published by Grove Atlantic in May 2024. It was also published with the subtitle "A History of Evil" by Grove Press UK in October 2024. The book traces how the concept of the Devil has changed throughout history and whether he is real. Topics explored by Sullivan include Christian theology, satanic cults, and human sacrifice by the Aztecs. The book also offers a personal account of Sullivan grappling with the nature of evil.

The book received mixed reviews, with praise for the compelling narrative but criticism for the frequent shifts between storylines. Some reviewers also found Sullivan's conclusions unsatisfying.

== Contents ==
The book begins with Sullivan witnessing an exorcism in the Bosnian village of Međugorje. This event left a deep impression, and it prompted Sullivan to begin a quest to uncover if the Devil exists, and if so, in what form. Sullivan next takes the reader to Catemaco, Mexico, where he attended a Black Mass in which participants pledged their souls to the devil. Sullivan's narrative then moves through centuries of historical, religious, and cultural conceptions of evil and the Devil: from the Mesopotamian and Egyptian gods through apocryphal books like the Book of Enoch to the Book of Job (where he is allowed by Yahweh to take Job’s family, wealth and health to see if Job will curse Yahweh) to the New Testament to the witch hunts in Europe in the 15th through 17th centuries to the history of the Devil-worshipping "Black Mass" ceremony and its depictions in 19th-century French literature.

Sullivan acknowledges that the idea of Satan as an opponent of God and a purely evil figure only seems to emerge during the Second Temple Period Judaism, probably due to Zoroastrian dualistic concepts such as Ahriman, particularly in the apocalypses. Only in Christianity, Sullivan argues, has the Devil been absolutely essential from the very beginning. Jesus was tempted by Satan, cast out demons and warned his disciples about the Devil. The Gospel of John, Sullivan writes, is in its entirety the story of a cosmic conflict between God's light and the darkness of the Devil. The authors of the books of the New Testament repeat the idea that Jesus came to break the hold of Satan.

He references major literary, religious and historical figures, Zoroaster, Plato, Augustine, Thomas Aquinas, Martin Luther, John Milton, and many more, among them Charles Baudelaire, from whose work Sullivan took the title of the book. Interspersed throughout the historical review, Sullivan discusses the circumstances surrounding the deaths of Tate Rowland and Terrie Trosper in Childress, Texas. Rowland and Trosper died under mysterious circumstances, with possible connections to satanic cults. Sullivan's account of how belief in the Devil gradually disappeared in the West is conventional. Witch hunts in Europe in the 15th and 16th centuries reached a climax in England in the 17th, when a professional "witchfinder" named Matthew Hopkins managed to execute some 300 women over a two-year period in the 1640s. The abuse of these trials, combined with anticlericalism in 18th-century France and changing attitudes toward the supernatural, led to increasing skepticism regarding the reality of a literal Devil. Sullivan also discusses human sacrifices and cannibalism by the Aztecs, positing that these acts support the existence of the Devil. At the end of the book, Sullivan concludes that the Devil is real in the sense of how people comprehend evil by personifying it.

== Reception ==
In a positive review for The New York Times, Clancy Martin describes the book as a "master class in the difficult art of first-person, narrative nonfiction". Martin praises Sullivan's ability to propel the story and to captivate the reader, even when delving into ecclesiastical history. The originality of the perspective also impressed Martin, who stated: "The writing is never clichéd, nor is the thinking". Micah Mattix of The Wall Street Journal gave a mostly positive review, writing: "Mr. Sullivan is a gifted storyteller, even if the shifts between recent events and intellectual history can be jarring." Mattix noted, however, that "not everyone will find [Sullivan's] concluding equivocation satisfying."

A negative review from Carl Hoffman in The Washington Post criticized the book as "one big, sloppy mess that is written strictly from the perspective of the minority of humankind who call themselves Christians". Hoffman viewed Sullivan's exploration of evil as myopic because it almost exclusively approaches the subject from the perspective of Catholic Christianity. He also thought that the book shifted unproductively between disparate storylines and that the discussions of the deaths in Childress, Texas lacked any compelling insights. Hoffman states: "There are hints along this crooked journey that Sullivan was as confused while writing his book as I was reading it".
