= Richard Beaumont (actor) =

British actor (1961–2022)

- Born: Richard Edward Beaumont; 5 April 1961; St Albans, Hertfordshire, England
- Died: 26 April 2022 (aged 61)
- Occupation: Actor
- Years active: 1969–2016
- Spouse: Lynn Beaumont

Richard Andrew Beaumont (5 April 1961 – 26 April 2022) was a British actor. He was known for playing the role of Tiny Tim in the 1970 film Scrooge, a musical version of A Christmas Carol by Charles Dickens, starring Albert Finney.

Beaumont died after a short illness on 26 April 2022, at the age of 61, eleven days after his son Bobby had died at the age of 36.

== Selected filmography ==
- Strange Report (1969)
- The Wednesday Play (1970)
- Scrooge (1970)
- Mr. Tumbleweed (1971)
- Whoever Slew Auntie Roo? (1972)
- Demons of the Mind (1972)
- Zinotchka (1972)
- Digby, the Biggest Dog in the World (1973)
- Great Expectations (1974)
- Churchill's People (1974–75)
- Leap in the Dark (1980)
- Little Nemo: Adventures in Slumberland (1989)
