= Charles Thomson (journalist) =

British journalist

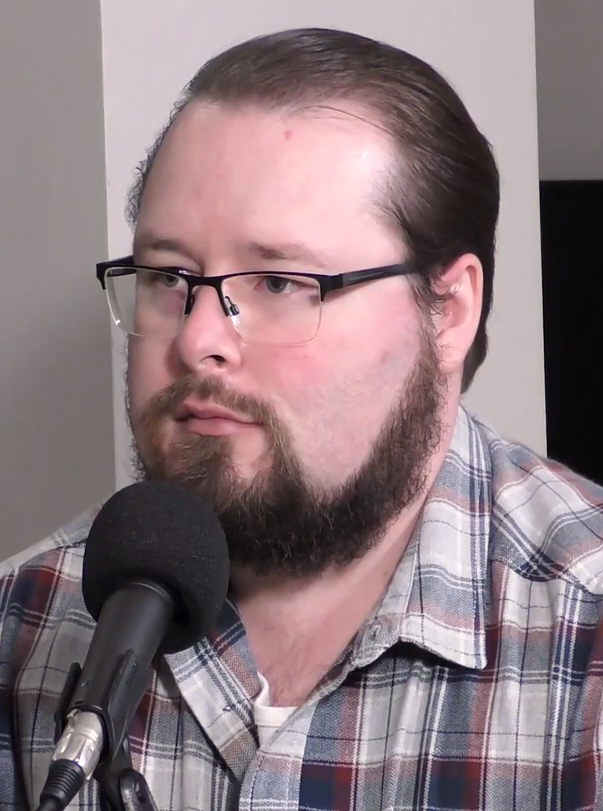
- Thomson in 2020
- Born: 1988; United Kingdom
- Occupation: Investigative/music journalist

Charles Thomson is a British investigative journalist. He has written for media outlets including The Sun, The Mirror, The Guardian, Mojo, Wax Poetics and the Huffington Post. From 2011 to 2019, he worked at Yellow Advertiser. He is best known for his investigation into the cover up of a historic child sex ring, for which he won multiple journalism awards.

== Work ==
Thomson spent years investigating the cover-up of a historic paedophile ring in Shoebury, Essex, eventually finding evidence that the leader of the ring had been a police informant. The investigation began when he discovered a series of compensation payments authorised by Essex County Council for "alleged abuse" linked to its children's departments between the 1970s and the 1990s. His campaign for transparency over the payments led to a whistleblower coming forward with concerns about how authorities had handled an investigation into a 1980s paedophile ring in Shoebury.

When other whistleblowers came forward with corroborating stories, Thomson arranged for them to meet the then Essex Police and Crime Commissioner, Nick Alston, who in turn introduced them to the Chief Constable of Essex Police and a senior detective. These meetings resulted in police reopening the case and a man being arrested. Further work by Thomson later caused police to reopen the case a second time. Thomson discovered a link between the Shoebury ring and the sex offender Lennie Smith, a member of the "Dirty Dozen" paedophile gang, which was responsible for the deaths of Jason Swift, Barry Lewis and Mark Tildseley in the 1980s. Thomson also discovered old files that documented the cover-up of the Shoebury case in real-time. The documents included a confession by a police officer that the leader of the paedophile ring had been a "registered informant", despite decades of sexual offending against children.

In 2008, Thomson interviewed James Brown's former co-writer Fred Wesley for Wax Poetics magazine. During the interview, Wesley spoke about working on Brown's final album in 2005. The interview inspired Thomson to research the album, spending several months interviewing more than a dozen people who were directly involved in its production. In October 2010, Tomi Rae Brown, the widow of Brown, gave Thomson an interview. In the article published by Sawf News, Brown spoke about her husband's 2004 arrest for domestic assault and how she nursed him through cancer in 2005. She also claimed that Brown's legs had been sawn off after his death to obtain DNA to prove her son's paternity. Thomson has also written about Brown for Mojo magazine and spoken about the singer on the Los Angeles radio station KPFA-FM.

Thomson's work on Michael Jackson's 2005 trial was cited in Randall Sullivan's 2012 Jackson biography Untouchable: The Strange Life and Tragic Death of Michael Jackson. His work was also cited in other Jackson biographies including Joseph Vogel's Man in the Music, Mike Smallcombe's Making Michael and J. Randy Taraborrelli's The Magic and the Madness.

== Awards and commendations ==
Thomson won a 2009 "Special Commendation" in the Feature Writer of the Year category at the Guardian Student Media Awards, 2009. The commendation was created in 2009 especially to acknowledge the strength of Thomson's article, "James Brown: The Lost Album", which pieced together the final recording sessions of the so-called "Godfather of Soul". One competition judge later commented, "I thought it was the best piece of student journalism I'd read in a long time, if not ever."

In 2015, he was named Weekly Print Journalist of the Year at the East of England Media Awards, organized by HoldTheFrontPage.

In 2016, Thomson won the "Highly Commended" award in the Local Heroes category at the British Journalism Awards. In 2018, Thomson was shortlisted in the category for the second time.

In 2017, he was named Highly Commended Weekly Reporter of the Year at the Society of Editors Regional Press Awards. In 2018, he won the commendation for the second consecutive year.

In 2018, Thomson won the inaugural Ray Fitzwalter Award for Investigative Journalism out of 3 applicants. The award, created in honour of the World in Action journalist Ray Fitzwalter, was sponsored by ITV and Channel 4. Thomson won for his Shoebury sex ring investigation. The judges praised Thomson's "resourcefulness and determination". His campaign led the police to reopen their investigation into this case.

In 2018 he was named Weekly Reporter of the Year.

A month later, he was awarded a commendation in the MHP 30 to Watch awards, which identifies Britain's "most talented and influential journalists" aged 30 and under.

He was shortlisted for the Paul Foot Award 2020 for his Yellow Advertiser investigation into a paedophile police informant.

On 19 June 2020, Thomson was announced, for the third year in 4 years, as "highly commended" in the weekly reporter section when the winners of Regional Press Awards for 2019 were announced. One judge said, "[He is] already an award winner who refuses to give up even when his paper folds. Tireless in his pursuit of justice, never thwarted by officialdom a credit to his trade."
