= Leaving Neverland 2: Surviving Michael Jackson =

2025 documentary film

- Title card
- Directed by: Dan Reed
- Country of origin: United Kingdom
- Original language: English

Production
- Producers: Marguerite Gaudin; Dan Reed
- Editors: Peter Haddon; Ben Hills
- Running time: 53 minutes
- Production company: Amos Pictures

Original release
- Network: Channel 4
- Release: 18 March 2025

Leaving Neverland 2: Surviving Michael Jackson is a 2025 British documentary television film directed and produced by Dan Reed. It is the sequel to Leaving Neverland (2019).

== Summary ==
The documentary is the followup to Leaving Neverland (2019), which followed two men, Wade Robson and James Safechuck, who say they were sexually abused as children by the American singer Michael Jackson. Leaving Neverland 2 covers their attempt to take their allegations to trial.

Unlike the first film, HBO was uninvolved due to a legal dispute with the Jackson estate, which resulted in U.S. courts ruling that Leaving Neverland violated a non-disparagement clause from a 1992 contract related to a HBO concert special for Jackson's Dangerous World Tour. In October 2024, the case was dismissed by both parties, resulting in Max removing the film without the possibility of returning to the platform.

== Release ==
Leaving Neverland 2: Surviving Michael Jackson premiered on Channel 4 in the United Kingdom on 18 March 2025. Little Dot Studios acquired the U.S and Canada rights, and the film premiered at Real Stories on YouTube.

== Reception ==
Unlike its predecessor, Leaving Neverland 2 received mixed to negative reviews from critics. In The Guardian, Jack Seale gave the documentary sequel a three out of five, writing that its affecting points were already covered in Leaving Neverland and that it suffered from the lack of representation from the Jackson estate, who declined to participate. He concluded that Reed should have waited until the final trial before making the film. Pat Fitzpatrick, writing for The Irish Examiner, felt it "lacks the explosive impact of the first show".
