= The Boy Who Stole the Elephant =

- Genre: Adventure
- Based on: The Boy Who Stole the Elephant by Julilly House Kohler
- Written by: John McGreevey
- Directed by: Michael Caffey
- Starring: Mark Lester; David Wayne; Dabbs Greer; Richard Kiel
- Composer: Buddy Baker
- Country of origin: United States
- Original language: English

Production
- Producer: Winston Hibler
- Production company: Walt Disney Productions

Original release
- Network: NBC
- Release: September 20 – September 27, 1970

The Boy Who Stole the Elephant is a 1970 American television film starring Mark Lester. It was produced by Winston Hibler.

It was originally filmed as a two part episode of The Wonderful World of Disney and aired on NBC on September 20 and 27, 1970. It was filmed in December 1969.

The film was based on the 1952 book of the same name written by Julilly House Kohler, which was based on a true incident that occurred during the turn of the century in Kentucky.

The film was directed by Michael Caffey, with teleplay by John McGreevey, art direction by John B. Mansbridge, set decoration by Emile Kuri and Frank R. McKelvy, music by Buddy Baker, and sound by Robert O. Cook.

== Cast ==
- Mark Lester as Davey
- June Havoc as Molly Jeffrys
- David Wayne as Colonel Rufus Ryder
- Parley Baer as Mayor Hancock
- Whitney Blake as Helen Owens
- Walter Burke as Tinker
- Ernestine Clark as Nana
- Tom Clark as Drake
- Robert Emhardt as Cy Brown
- William Fawcett as Elmer
- Dabbs Greer as Stilts
- Richard Kiel as Luke Brown
- Betty Lynn as Lottie Ladare
- Susan Olsen as Lucy Owens
- Danny Rees as De Marco
- Christopher Shea as Billy Owens
- Doris Singleton as Lizzie Ladare
- Hal Smith as Reb Canfield
- James Westerfield as Sheriff Berry
