= Mark Lester =

English actor (born 1958)

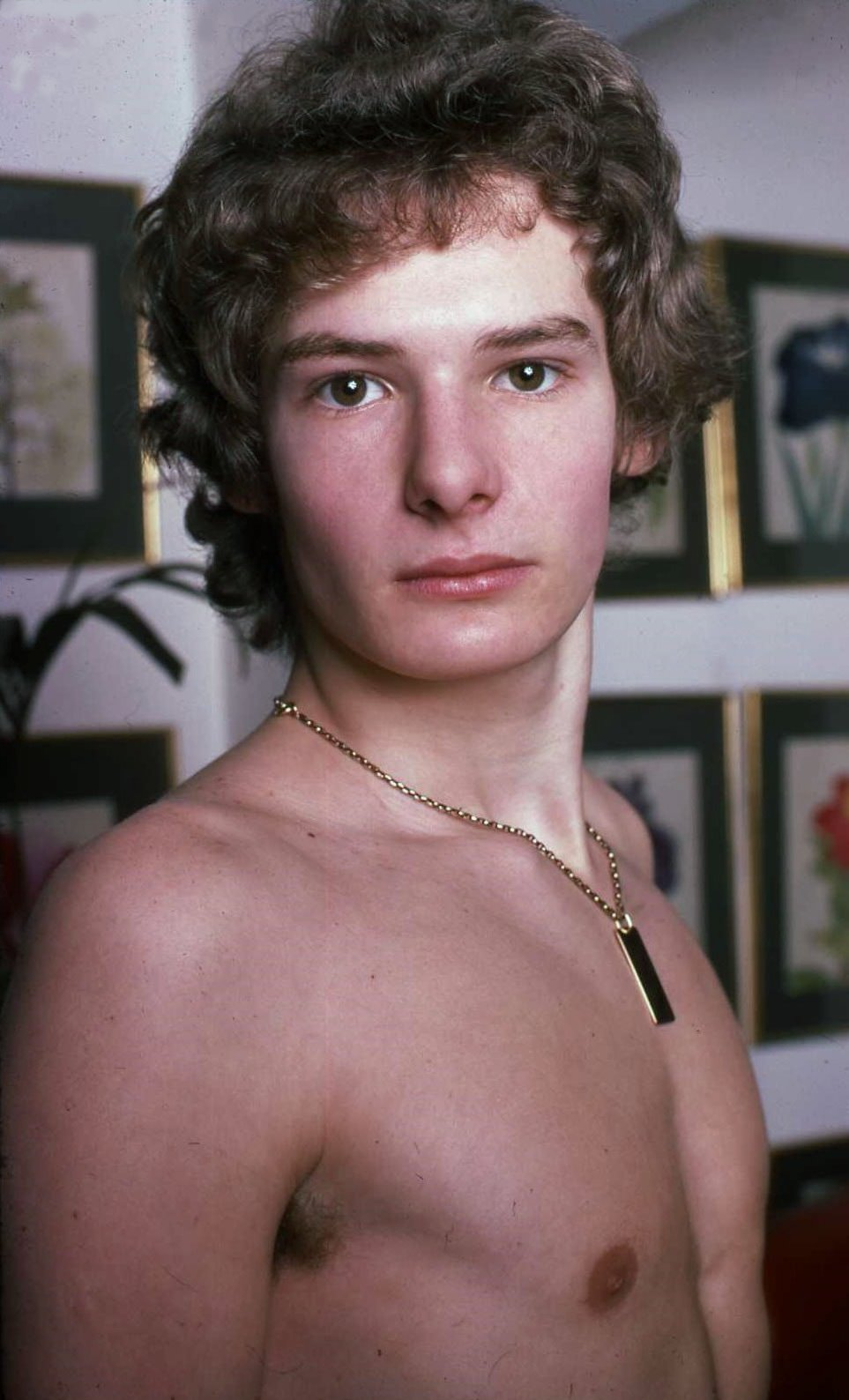
- Lester in 1977
- Born: Mark A. Letzer; 11 July 1958 (age 68); Oxford, England
- Occupations: Actor; osteopath; acupuncturist
- Years active: 1964–1977 (actor)
- Spouse(s): Jane (m. 1993; div. 2005) Lisa (m. 2006; div. 2009)
- Children: 4

Mark Lester (born Mark A. Letzer; 11 July 1958) is an English former child actor who starred in a number of British and European films in the 1960s and 1970s. In 1968 he played the title role in the film Oliver!, a musical version of the stage production by Lionel Bart based on Charles Dickens' novel Oliver Twist. He also made several appearances in many British television series. In 1977, after appearing in The Prince and the Pauper, an all-star international action adventure film, he retired from acting. In the 1980s, he trained as an osteopath specialising in sports injuries.

== Early life ==
Mark Lester was born in Oxford, England on 11 July 1958, to Rita Keene Lester, an actress, and Michael Lester (originally Michael Boris Letzer), an actor and producer. His father is Jewish and his mother Anglican. He was educated at three independent schools, Corona Theatre School in Ravenscourt Park in West London, then Tower House School, a boys' preparatory school near Richmond Park (West London), and at Halliford School in Shepperton in Surrey.

== Acting career ==
=== Early performances ===
Lester initially had small roles in several British television series including The Human Jungle and Danger Man. In 1964, at the age of six, Lester was cast in Robert Dhéry's film Allez France! (1964). The English title of the movie is The Counterfeit Constable and Diana Dors starred in it.

He appeared in Spaceflight IC-1: An Adventure in Space (1965), played a small part as the second schoolboy in Fahrenheit 451 (1966) and had a larger role in Our Mother's House (1967).

=== Oliver! and child stardom ===
In 1967, at eight, Lester was cast in the title role in the film version of Lionel Bart's musical Oliver! (1968). The multiple Academy Award-winning adaptation of Charles Dickens' novel co-starred Jack Wild, Ron Moody, Harry Secombe, Shani Wallis, and Oliver Reed. It was directed by Carol Reed. Since Lester could not sing, his singing was dubbed by Kathe Green, daughter of the film's music arranger Johnny Green. Lester received critical acclaim for his portrayal of a dysfunctional and withdrawn only child in Run Wild, Run Free (1969), starring opposite John Mills, released by Columbia Pictures who financed Oliver!. He played a disturbed child in the first regular episode of Then Came Bronson ("The Runner") and guest starred on The Ghost & Mrs. Muir. Columbia wanted to sign him to a long-term contract but Lester's parents refused.

Lester had leading roles in Eyewitness (1970), a British thriller with Susan George shot on Malta; The Boy Who Stole the Elephant (1970), a TV movie for Disney; and the horror film Whoever Slew Auntie Roo? (1971), with Shelley Winters. He was reunited with Wild in Melody (1971), which depicted schoolchildren in love, based on a script by Alan Parker. Tracy Hyde played the role of Melody in the film, which used music from the Bee Gees and Crosby, Stills, Nash & Young. Lester starred in a film version of Black Beauty (1971). He was announced for a version of Treasure Island but it was never made. After this period, his acting roles in the UK would begin to wane. This coincided with a decline in the British film industry.

=== European films ===
Lester remained in demand for films outside England: What the Peeper Saw (1972) with Britt Ekland; Senza ragione (1973), in Italy with Franco Nero; Little Adventurer (1973), a Japanese film; Scalawag (1973), a pirate film with Kirk Douglas shot in Yugoslavia; and the costume drama La Prima volta sull'erba (English title The First Time on the Grass, 1974), which was nominated for the Golden Bear prize at the 25th Berlin International Film Festival in Berlin, Germany.

He ended his film career playing the dual role as Edward VI and Tom Canty in the all-star film The Prince and the Pauper (U.S. title: Crossed Swords, 1977) starring Raquel Welch, Charlton Heston, Rex Harrison, George C. Scott, and Oliver Reed, who had played Bill Sikes in Oliver!. After that, he said, "I bought myself a Ferrari and set off traveling through Europe for 18 months."

== Later life ==
At the age of 28, he took his A-levels, passing chemistry and biology. He became an osteopath, studying at the British School of Osteopathy, and in 1993, Lester opened the Carlton Clinic, an acupuncture clinic in Cheltenham. He is a patron of the theatre charity The Music Hall Guild of Great Britain and America.

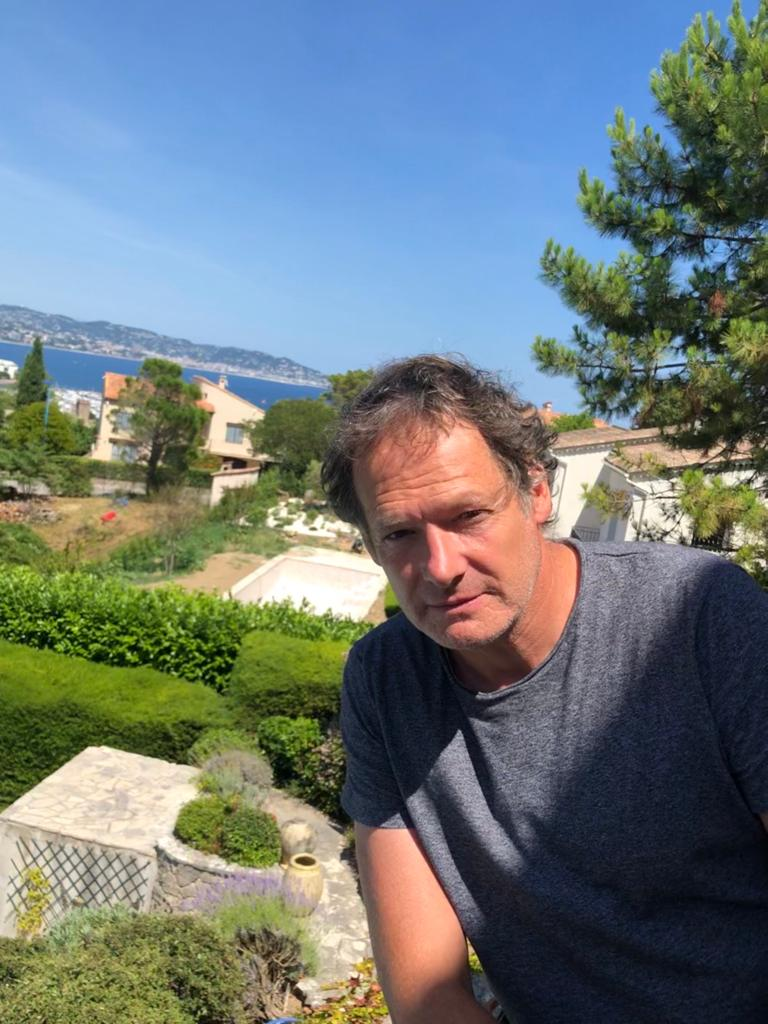
Lester in 2022

== Personal life ==
Lester has four children with his first wife, Jane, whom he married in January 1993 and divorced in 2005. In 2006 he and Lisa, a psychiatric nurse and his second wife, married. They divorced in 2009.

He was a close friend of Michael Jackson and is the godfather of Jackson's three children. In August 2009 in an interview with News of the World (a British tabloid) after Jackson's death, Lester claimed that he could be the biological father of Paris, the late singer's daughter. Lester said he was a sperm donor for Jackson in 1996 and announced that he was willing to take a paternity test to determine whether he was the father. Brian Oxman, former lawyer for the Jackson family, rejected the claim in a television interview and said, "The thing I always heard from Michael was that Michael was the father of these children, and I believe Michael." In 2019, Lester said that he was one of 20 sperm donors for Jackson. Lester appears in the documentary, Michael Jackson: Chase the Truth, in which he doubts allegations of sexual misconduct that had been made against Jackson by Wade Robson, an Australian performer, and James Safechuck.

== Filmography ==
=== Film ===
Year	Title	Role	Notes
1964	The Counterfeit Constable	Gérald	a.k.a. Allez France
1965	Spaceflight IC-1: An Adventure in Space	Don Saunders	
1966	Fahrenheit 451	Schoolboy	(uncredited)
1967	Our Mother's House	Jiminee	
1968	Oliver!	Oliver Twist	
1969	Run Wild, Run Free	Philip Ransome	
1970	The Boy Who Stole the Elephant	Davey	TV movie
1970	Eyewitness	Ziggy	
1971	Melody (released as S.W.A.L.K.)	Daniel Latimer	
1971	Black Beauty	Joe Evans	
1971	Whoever Slew Auntie Roo?	Christopher Coombs	
1972	What the Peeper Saw	Marcus	
1973	Redneck	Lennox Duncan	
1973	Little Adventurer	Mike Richard	
1973	Scalawag	Jamie	
1975	The First Time on the Grass	Franz Schmidt	a.k.a. La prima volta sull'erba
1977	The Prince and the Pauper	Prince Edward/Tom Canty	a.k.a. Crossed Swords
2019	Michael Jackson: Chase the Truth	Himself	Documentary film

=== Television ===
Year	Title	Role	Notes
1964	The Human Jungle	Small boy	TV series (1 episode The Twenty-Four Hour Man)
1966	Danger Man	A boy	TV series (1 episode Dangerous Secret)
1966	Court Martial	Paolo Stevens	TV series (1 episode Retreat from Life)
1969	Then Came Bronson	John Beaman	TV series (1 episode The Runner)
1969	The Ghost & Mrs. Muir	Mark Helmore	TV series (2 episodes Puppy Love and Spirit of the Law)
1970	Disneyland	Davey	(Film in two parts)

== Bibliography ==
- Holmstrom, John; The Moving Picture Boy: An International Encyclopaedia from 1895 to 1995; Norwich, Michael Russell, 1996; pp. 323–324
- Dye, David; Child and Youth Actors: Filmography of Their Entire Careers, 1914-1985; Jefferson, NC: McFarland & Co., 1988; pp. 130–131
