= Dan Reed (director) =

British screenwriter, director, and producer

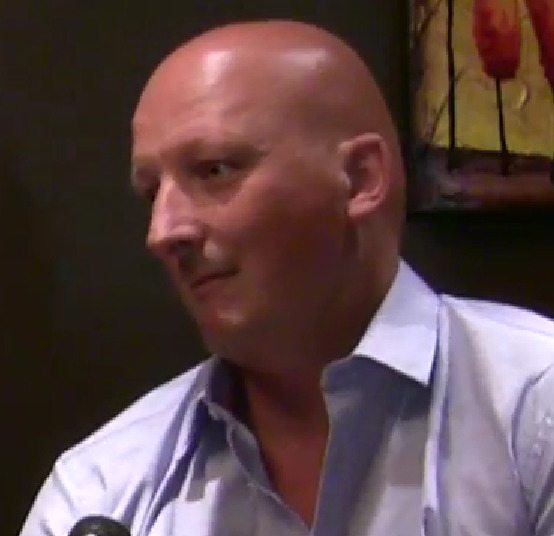
- Reed in 2014
- Born: 1964 or 1965 (age 61–62)
- Citizenship: United Kingdom
- Education: University of Cambridge
- Occupation: Documentary filmmaker

Dan Reed is a British documentary filmmaker. He studied Russian at the University of Cambridge prior to taking a job with the BBC as an assistant producer to documentary filmmaker Adam Curtis.

His first film, The Valley, which he produced and directed for Channel 4, documented the Kosovo War. It won a Peabody Award. He next directed and produced Terror in Moscow, released in 2003, which documented the Moscow theater hostage crisis and incorporated the terrorists' own footage.

His film, In the Shadow of 9/11, about the Liberty City Seven, aired on Frontline on PBS. Reed is widely known for the controversial documentary Leaving Neverland for which he won an Emmy and a BAFTA. His production house is Amos Pictures. In 2024, Reed directed and produced the Peabody Award-winning film The Truth vs. Alex Jones.

== Filmography ==
| Year | Title | Notes |
|---|---|---|
| 2000 | The Valley | |
| 2003 | Terror in Moscow | |
| 2009 | Terror in Mumbai | |
| 2010 | The Battle for Haiti | |
| 2012 | Children of the Tsunami | |
| 2013 | Legally High | |
| 2014 | The Paedophile Hunter | |
| 2014 | Terror at the Mall | |
| 2015 | Escorts | |
| 2015 | From Russia with Cash | |
| 2016 | 3 Days of Terror: The Charlie Hebdo Attacks | |
| 2017 | Calais, the End of the Jungle | |
| 2019 | Leaving Neverland | |
| 2021 | In the Shadow of 9/11 | |
| 2021 | Four Hours at the Capitol | Executive producer |
| 2024 | The Truth vs. Alex Jones | |
| 2024 | Stopping the Steal | |
| 2024 | One Day In October | |
| 2025 | Leaving Neverland 2: Surviving Michael Jackson | |
