= Helen Littleboy =

British film director

- Citizenship: United Kingdom
- Occupation: Film producer
- Years active: 1994-present
- Employer: Royal Holloway, University of London

Helen Littleboy is a British film producer and director, specialising in documentary productions for British television.

In addition to her production roles, she is also an Associate Professor in Documentary Practice at Royal Holloway, University of London.

== Filmography ==
- Does Your Mother Know (1994) - director
- White Tribe (Diverse Productions, 2000) - producer
- The Truth About Gay Animals (2002) - director
- Testosterone (Raw TV, 2003) - producer/director
- Michael Jackson and the Boy He Paid Off (2004) - director
- Michael Jackson's Boys (2005) - director
- The Battle for Brixton (Blast! Films, 2006) - producer/director
- The Real Vampire Chronicles (Blast! Films) - director
- Revenge of the Bin Men (Films of Record, 2009) - executive producer
- UR SO V41N (Films of Record, 2009) - executive producer
- My Boyfriend the MI5 Hoaxer (Ronachan Films, 2009) - executive producer
