= The Blinding of Isaac Woodard =

Song by Woody Guthrie

"The Blinding of Isaac Woodard" is a song written by folk performer Woody Guthrie for his 1946 album The Great Dust Storm (the song does not actually appear on the album, however). The lyrics were inspired by the 1946 aggravated assault and blinding of World War II veteran Isaac Woodard in a county jail in South Carolina. The song mistakenly references Aiken, South Carolina, as the location of this savage beating. Batesburg, a small textile milling town nearly 30 miles to the northeast served as the actual location of the incident which sparked a major civil rights issue. The song title appears to be a reference to the biblical tale of the Binding of Isaac.

Guthrie later wrote, "I sung this Isaac Woodard song in the Lewisohn Stadium one night for more than 36,000 people, and I got the loudest applause I've ever got in my whole life. This song is a long song, but most of the action is told in Isaac's own words. I made this ballad up because we'll need lots of songs like this one before we win our fight for racial equality in our big free United States."

== Lyrics ==
My name is Isaac Woodard, my tale I'll tell you;
I'm sure it'll sound so terrible you might not think it true;
I joined up with the Army, they sent me overseas;
Through the battles of New Guinea and in the Philippines.

On the 13th day of February 1946
They sent me to Atlanta and I got my discharge pin;
I caught the bus for Winnsboro, going to meet my wife,
Then we were coming to New York City to visit my parents both.

About an hour out of Atlanta, the sun was going down,
We stopped the bus at a drugstore in a little country town,
I walked up to the driver and I looked him in the eye,
"I'd like to go to the washroom, if you think we got time."

The driver started cursing, and then he hollered, "No!"
So, then I cussed right back at him, and really got him told.
He said, "If you will hurry, I guess I'll take the time!"
It was in a few short minutes we was rolling down the line.

We rolled for thirty minutes, I watched the shacks and trees,
I thought of my wife in Winnsboro waiting there for me.
In Aiken, South Carolina, the driver he jumped out;
He came back with a policeman to take me off the bus.

"Listen, Mr. Policeman," I started to explain,
"I did not cause no trouble, and I did not raise no cain."
He hit me with his billy, he cursed me up and down,
"Shut up, you black bastard"; and he walked me down in town.

As we walked along the sidewalk, my right arm he did twist;
I knew he wanted me to fight back, but I never did resist;
"Have you your Army discharge?" I told him, yes, I had;
He pasted me with his loaded stick down across my head.

I grabbed his stick and we had a little run, and had a little wrastle;
When another cop run up with a gun and jumped into the battle;
"If you don't drop that sap, black boy, it's me that's dropping you."
So I figured to drop that loaded sap was the best thing I could do.

They beat me about the head and face and left a bloody trail
All down along the sidewalk to the iron door of the jail;
He knocked me down upon the ground and he poked me in the eyes;
When I woke up next morning, I found my eyes were blind.

They drug me to the courtroom, and I could not see the judge;
He fined me fifty dollars for raising all the fuss;
The doctor finally got there but it took him two whole days;
He handed me some drops and salve and told me to treat myself.

It's now you've heard my story, there's one thing I can't see,
How you could treat a human like they have treated me;
I thought I fought on the islands to get rid of their kind;
But I can see the fight lots plainer now that I am blind.

== External references ==
- "The Blinding of Isaac Woodard" from the History in Song website
