= Danny Wu =

Canadian director and writer

- Born: March 2, 1996 (age 30); Chengdu, China
- Occupation: Filmmaker
- Years active: 2019-present

Danny Wu (born March 2, 1996) is a Canadian director and writer. He is best known for directing American: An Odyssey to 1947 which was placed on Jonathan Rosenbaum’s list for "best films of 2022."

== Early life ==
Danny Wu was born in Chengdu, China on March 2, 1996, but immigrated to Canada with his family at the age of 7. In high school, Wu dreamed of being a professional basketball player, while he also worked as a magician. During the pandemic, Wu stayed in Chengdu with his family and created a 22-minute short program titled “My Life in China during the Pandemic.” The project was subsequently broadcast by CNN affiliate N1.

== Career ==
Danny Wu's first film Square One was released in 2019 on Prime Video. In describing Wu's style, critic Josiah Teal for Film threat wrote that “Wu paces the documentary almost like an A24 film…the vibe of tension and release creates a mood much closer to something like The Lobster than a typical celebrity documentary.”

American: An Odyssey to 1947 was Wu's first film to enter the film festival circuit. It features a collection of stories leading to the year 1947, most notably about the politics of Orson Welles. The film screened at the Thessaloniki International Documentary Festival in 2023, and was placed on Jonathan Rosenbaum's list for best films of the year. In addition it was also screened at the Austin Film Festival, and the It's All True International Documentary Festival. In a review by David Walsh for WSWS, he describes that “In a short period of time, he has developed an important understanding of some of the most vexing problems of the mid-20th century.” Walsh claimed the film as evidence that “a new generation of artists, free from the cynicism and many of the prejudices of the past several decades, is emerging.”
