= Scott Ross (private investigator) =

American private investigator (1956–2023)

Scott Ross (October 2, 1956 - May 2, 2023) was a high-profile American private investigator who worked on many notable cases such as Robert Blake, Michael Jackson, Chris Brown, Sylvester Stallone, Danny Masterson and Bill Cosby.

In 2018, he launched a radio show, All Things P.I..
