= Randall Sullivan =

American author and journalist

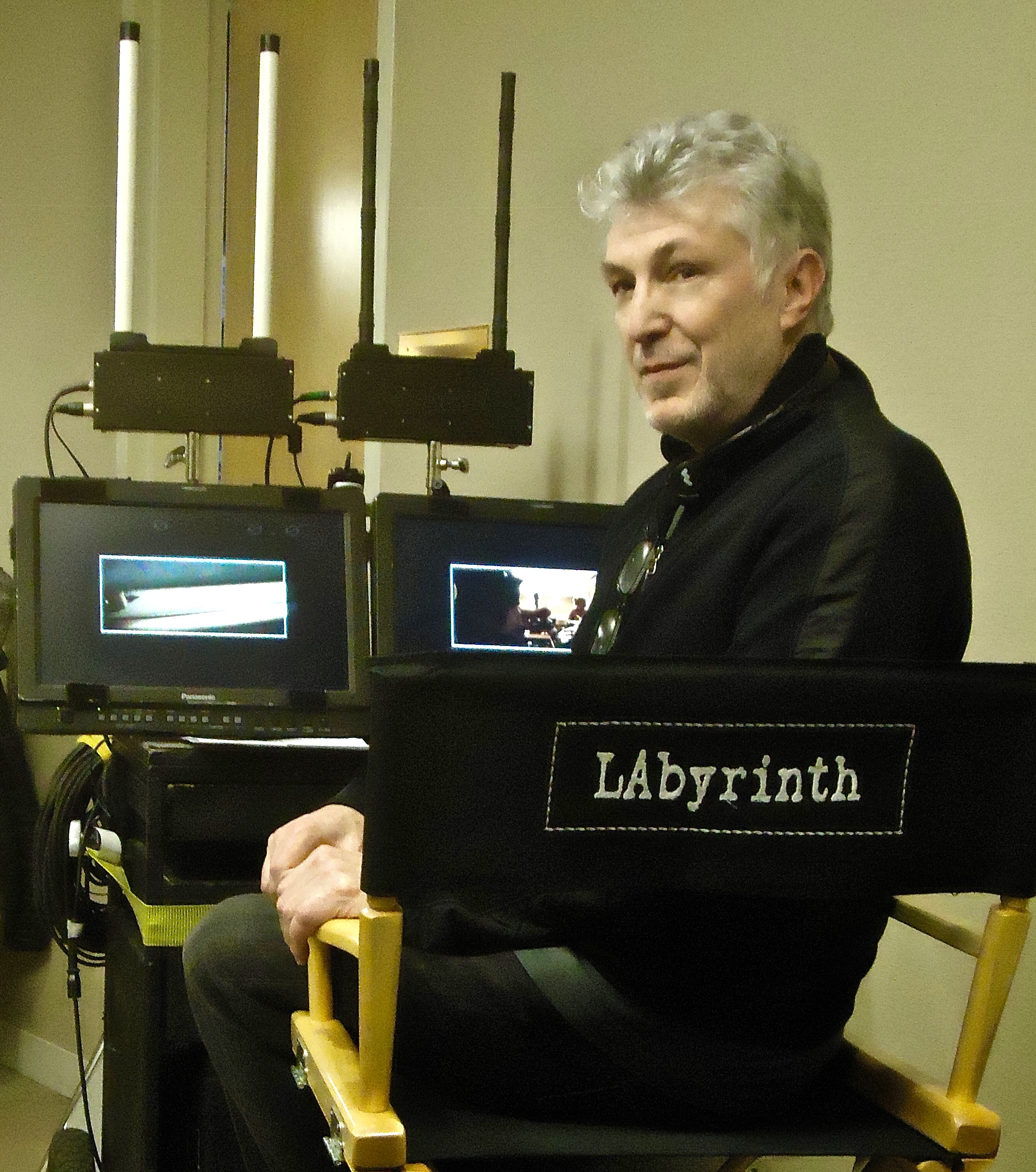
- Sullivan on the set of City of Lies in 2017
- Born: Los Angeles, California, U.S.
- Education: University of Oregon (B.A.) Columbia University (M.F.A.)
- Occupations: Writer, Producer, Actor
- Writing career
- Notable works: The Price of Experience; LAbyrinth; Untouchable

Randall Sullivan is an American author and journalist who has also worked as a screenwriter, film and television producer and on-camera television personality.

== Life ==
=== Early life and education ===
Sullivan was born in Los Angeles and grew up in North Bend, Oregon. When he was a teenager, his family moved to Portland, Oregon, where he attended Sunset High School. "In high school, I was a football jock who was always in trouble." After high school, he enrolled at the University of Oregon and went on to graduate with a bachelor's degree in English (with honors) in 1974. In 1976 he accepted a two-year writing fellowship at Columbia University; he left with a master's degree a few years later. While he was at Columbia he took courses at the Columbia School of Journalism. After graduating from Columbia University, he took his first journalist position at the New York Daily News "for ten months." He later moved to Los Angeles to further his journalism career at the Herald Examiner and Rolling Stone.

=== Writing career ===
Randall Sullivan has “been making a living by writing since 1979." Sullivan has written for a number of nationally recognized publications, including Esquire; The Washington Post; The Guardian; Rolling Stone; and Wired. He "has written three books nominated for the Pulitzer Prize... [and] won a number of national awards."

==== The Billionaire Boys Club and The Price of Experience ====
In 1986, Sullivan wrote an article for Esquire detailing the corruption and criminal activities of the Billionaire Boys Club; the article “exposed the whole fascinating mess and briefly made Sullivan the brightest light in town [Los Angeles].” Sullivan was paid $250,000 to write a book based on the article; and, according to Jeff Baker of The Oregonian, this was “at that time... the highest advance ever paid to a first-time author.” The rights to the Esquire article were also used as a basis for the NBC television mini-series, Billionaire Boys Club. Although, the mini-series was nominated for two Golden Globe awards and four Emmys, it was considered "factually inaccurate" and did not stay true to the source material.

In 1996 Sullivan published The Price of Experience: Money, Power, Image, and Murder in Los Angeles, his long-awaited book about the Billionaire Boys Club. He spent ten years researching and writing the book; a book that Dick Adler of the Los Angeles Times described as “monumental." Sullivan's research included “hundreds of sources… eight former BBC members,” and personal jail-written letters from BBC ringleader Joe Hunt. The Price of Experience received positive reviews from the Los Angeles Times; The New Yorker; and The Boston Globe, among others. However, the release of the book was not without controversy; Sullivan received an anonymous death threat before a scheduled public book reading (which was subsequently cancelled); it is speculated that the threat could have came from someone affiliated with former members of the BBC.

==== LAbyrinth ====
In 2002, Sullivan published LAbyrinth: A Detective Investigates the Murders of Tupac Shakur and Notorious B.I.G., the Implication of Death Row Records' Suge Knight, and the Origins of the Los Angeles Police Scandal. The book was met with controversy and acclaim, for it connected (former) Death Row Records CEO Suge Knight and the Los Angeles Police Department with the deaths of prominent rap artists Tupac Shakur and Christopher Wallace (aka Biggie Smalls). The book was based largely on Sullivan's interviews with retired LAPD detective Russell Poole, who was “convinced that Death Row Records impresario Suge Knight orchestrated the killing of both” and that the LAPD helped cover up Suge Knight's association with the murders. Sullivan's book included “130 key players, a detailed timeline of events, and reference to 224 supporting documents,” making it one of the first detailed investigations of the murders available at the time of publishing. The book helped raise “publicity” surrounding the unsolved murders. Eric Boehlert, a former senior writer at Salon, argued that too much evidence was based on Poole's oral testimony, and that Sullivan's timeline of the events didn't matchup entirely. "Poole left the LAPD in 1999 after growing disagreements with the police force on numerous homicides, including the B.I.G. murder," but he continued to investigate the murders as a private detective. The FBI opened an investigation into the murder of Biggie in March 2003, in part spurred on by Poole's theory, but the FBI closed the investigation eighteen months later. In 2005, a key informant in the investigation "admitted hearsay... casting doubt" on the LAPDs involvement in covering up the murders. Poole was preparing to re-open the investigation with the LAPD in 2015, but he died suddenly from a heart attack. In 2016 it was announced that a film based on the book was in production. City of Lies, starring Johnny Depp and Forest Whitaker, was scheduled to be released in September 2018 but was later pushed back. In 2019, Sullivan publish a follow-up book titled Dead Wrong: The Continuing Story of City of Lies, Corruption and Cover-Up in the Notorious B.I.G. Murder Investigation.

==== The Miracle Detective ====
In April 2004, Sullivan publishedThe Miracle Detective, his book about his investigation into the apparition of 'Our Lady of Medjugorje' which is claimed to have appeared before six children in Medjugorgje, Bosnia, in 1981. His book was not only an investigation into the history of the apparition—and how other villagers and visitors since, have had similar visions at Medjugorgje—but also about his personal experience there, where he claims he experienced a miracle. The book has been called a "conversion narrative" by some, and met with skeptical criticism by others, however, it has also received positive reviews, especially from the Christian community where it remains a top seller (currently ranked in the top 150 books on Amazon for the category Mariology).

==== Untouchable ====
Published in November 2012, was Sullivan's book on the life and death of pop star Michael Jackson: Untouchable: The Strange Life and Tragic Death of Michael Jackson. The book was met with some controversy, mainly because Sullivan argued that Jackson was not a "child molester" and rather, that he was "pre-sexual" having never engaged in sexual intercourse at all. The book also detailed much of Jackson's drug abuse in his later years, money trouble, and "spending habits"—which upset many of Jackson's diehard fans. Some fans started an online campaign against the book's sale on Amazon. However, as Guardian columnist Deborah Orr points out: many of Jackson's more fanatic followers tend to criticize any negative press about Jackson's life, regardless of evidence or argument. Others called into question Sullivan's source material, and though Sullivan "does an adequate job of chronicling Jackson’s over-the-top fame," he relies on too few verifiable sources to draw his conclusions. Nonetheless, Jackson's long time attorney, Tom Mesereau, who was also one of Sullivan's main sources for his research on Jackson, came to Sullivan's defense and praised the book for its insight and accuracy. Still others praised the book; for example, there was "a glowing recommendation from broadcaster and journalist Danny Baker" who called it the "best" book about Jackson; and The New Yorker praised the book's in-depth research, viz., for bringing to light the "financial profligacy and wrongheadedness" of Jackson's life and business choices.

=== Film/Television ===
Sullivan is a long time member of the Writers Guild of America. He was co-writer on the made-for-TV movie, A Friend to Die For (based on Sullivan's article, "Death of a Cheerleader"). As a producer, he co-produced the documentary Reckless Indifference, and he was an executive producer on the Oprah Winfrey Network mini-series, Miracle Detectives. Sullivan also appears on the History Channel reality-TV show, The Curse of Oak Island. He produced the film, City of Lies starring Johnny Depp and Forest Whitaker.

=== Personal life ===
Sullivan lives in Portland, Oregon. For most of his life Sullivan identified as an atheist, but in 1995 he underwent a spiritual conversion to Catholicism while he was in Medjugorje reporting on the Bosnian War. This experience was influential to his research, writing, and co-hosting of the Oprah Winfrey Network show, Miracle Detectives. Sullivan is married to fashion model turned social activist Delores Sullivan (who recently published her debut memoir: A Good Place to Live: A Girl Comes of Age in the Rural Midwest); he met her while writing her profile for Rolling Stone magazine.

== Bibliography ==
=== Non-Fiction ===
- The Price of Experience: Money, Power, Image, and Murder in Los Angeles (1996) (nominated for Pulitzer)
- LAbyrinth: A Detective Investigates the Murders of Tupac Shakur and Notorious B.I.G., the Implication of Death Row Records' Suge Knight, and the Origins of the Los Angeles Police Scandal. (2002) (nominated for Pulitzer)
- The Miracle Detective: An Investigative Reporter Sets Out to Examine How the Catholic Church Investigates Holy Visions and Discovers His Own Faith. (2007) (nominated for Pulitzer)
- Untouchable: The Strange Life and Tragic Death of Michael Jackson (2012)
- The Curse of Oak Island (2019)
- Dead Wrong: The Continuing Story of City of Lies, Corruption and Cover-Up in the Notorious B.I.G. Murder Investigation (2019)
- Graveyard of the Pacific: Shipwreck & Survival on Americas Deadliest Waterway (2023)
- The Devil's Best Trick: How the Face of Evil Disappeared (2024)

=== "Best of" Anthology Works ===
- The Best of California Magazine (1986) [ISBN 0-88496-245-8]
- The Best of Rolling Stone: 25 Years of Journalism on the Edge (1993) [ISBN 0-385-47051-7]
- Outside 25: Classic Tales and New Voices from the Frontiers of Adventure (2002) [ISBN 0-393-05186-2]
