= Michael Jackson: Chase the Truth =

2019 documentary film

- Digital release poster
- Directed by: Jordan Hill
- Produced by: Brian Aabech
- Starring: Mike Smallcombe; Mark Lester; Lucy Lester; Matt Fiddes
- Production company: Entertain Me
- Distributed by: Amazon Prime Video
- Release date: 13 August 2019 (United Kingdom)
- Running time: 59 minutes
- Country: United Kingdom
- Language: English

Michael Jackson: Chase the Truth is a 2019 documentary film by Entertain Me Productions. The film defends singer Michael Jackson against allegations of child sexual abuse made by Wade Robson and James Safechuck in the 2019 documentary Leaving Neverland. It focuses on research from biographer and journalist Mike Smallcombe and statements by Jackson's former bodyguard Matt Fiddes and actor Mark Lester. It was released on streaming services such as YouTube and Amazon Prime on 13 August 2019.

== Synopsis ==
Describing Jackson as "acquitted in life, back on trial after death", Chase the Truth examines the allegations against Jackson, interviewing friends and former staff members. The film includes "testimony from Jackson's former bodyguard Matt Fiddes and actor Mark Lester", and presents their assertions that "Safechuck and Robson's abuse claims were fictitious and motivated by financial gain". It opens with a clip of Jackson denying the original allegations raised against him.

Fiddes and Jackson biographer Mike Smallcombe assert that allegations made against Jackson always had a financial incentive. Fiddes states that "Michael used to say to me, 'The bigger the star, the bigger the target' and he is still the biggest in death". Fiddes says that the assertions were never supported by evidence. The documentary discusses a previous court testimony made under oath by Jackson's accusers, including testimony by Robson that he was on a Grand Canyon trip with his family at a time that he later claimed he was abused at Neverland. It also states that Safechuck alleged abuse in the Neverland train station which was built more than a year after Safechuck's alleged abuse ended.

== Release and reception ==
The documentary was released on streaming services including Amazon Prime and YouTube. New Musical Express gave it two out of five stars, complaining of the one-hour length, choppy editing of interviews, and the £8 cost to purchase the film, and describing as "[h]ardly the way to spread its idea of the 'truth' as broadly as possible". However, the review did note that the film was not less believable than Leaving Neverland with "barely a trace of insincerity on display in either". Following the release of the documentary, Fiddes invited Safechuck and Robson to "come and challenge us on live UK TV" with respect to the claims and the refutations offered for them.

== See also ==
- Square One: Michael Jackson
- Neverland Firsthand: Investigating the Michael Jackson Documentary
