= Untouchable: The Strange Life and Tragic Death of Michael Jackson =

2012 biography by Randall Sullivan

- Author: Randall Sullivan
- Language: English
- Subject: Biography
- Publisher: Grove press UK
- Publication date: 2012
- Pages: 800

Untouchable: The Strange Life and Tragic Death of Michael Jackson is a 2012 biographical book written by Randall Sullivan. The book talks about the life and death of American entertainer Michael Jackson.

== Reception ==
The book was met with some controversy, Sullivan argued that Jackson was not a "child molester" and rather, that he was "pre-sexual" having never engaged in sexual intercourse at all. The book also detailed much of Jackson's drug abuse in his later years, money trouble, and "spending habits"—which upset many of Jackson's diehard fans. Some fans started an online campaign against the book's sale on Amazon. Guardian columnist Deborah Orr points out: many of Jackson's more fanatic followers tend to criticize any negative press about Jackson's life, regardless of evidence or argument. Others called into question Sullivan's source material, and though Sullivan "does an adequate job of chronicling Jackson’s over-the-top fame," he relies on too few verifiable sources to draw his conclusions. Nonetheless, Jackson's longtime attorney, Tom Mesereau, who was also one of Sullivan's main sources for his research on Jackson, came to Sullivan's defense and praised the book for its insight and accuracy. Still, others praised the book; for example, there was "a glowing recommendation from broadcaster and journalist Danny Baker" who called it the "best" book about Jackson; and The New Yorker praised the book's in-depth research, viz., for bringing to light the "financial profligacy and wrongheadedness" of Jackson's life and business choices.
