= Leaving Neverland =

2019 documentary film by Dan Reed

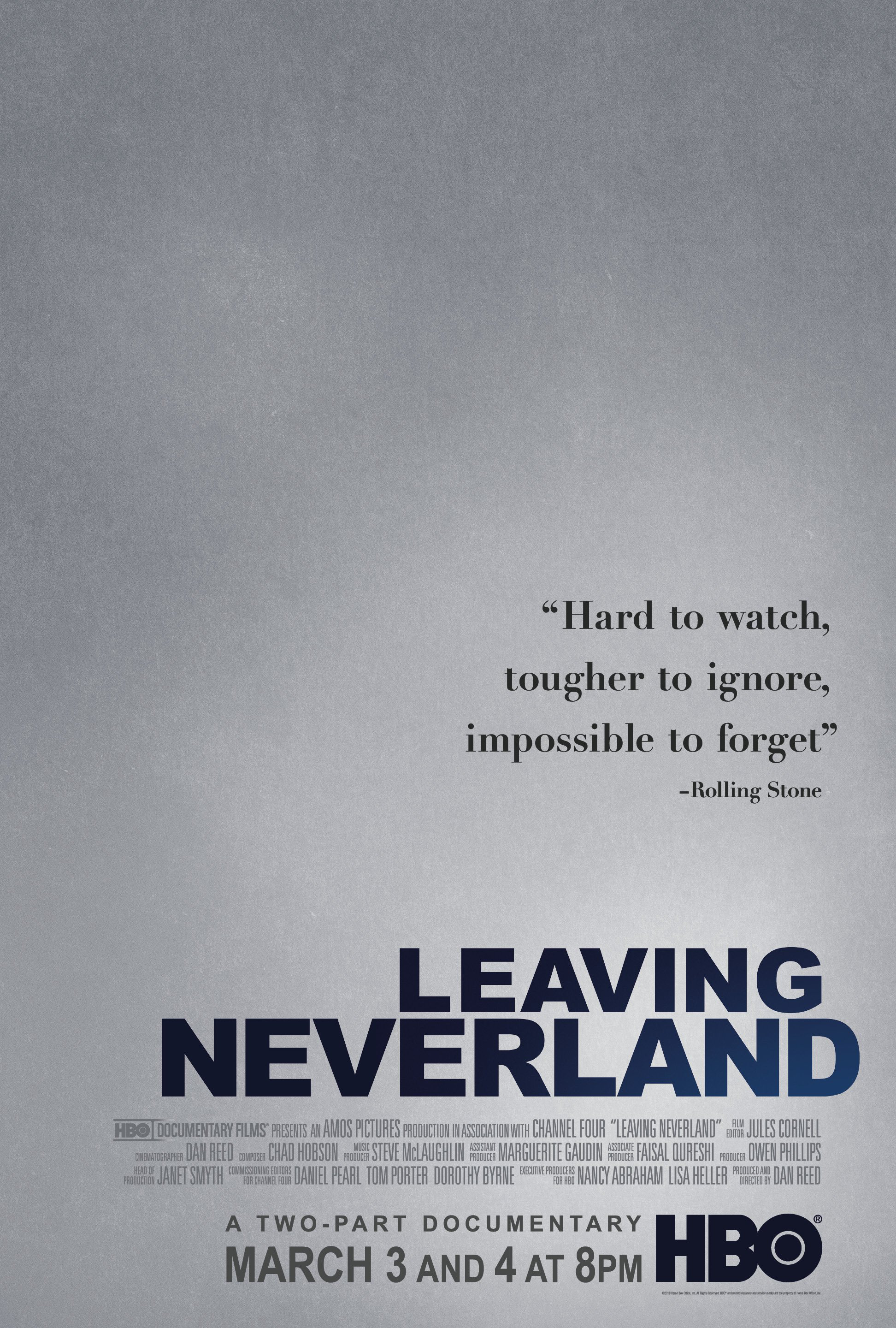
- American release poster
- Genre: Documentary; True crime
- Directed by: Dan Reed
- Starring: Wade Robson; James Safechuck
- Composer: Chad Hobson
- Countries of origin: United States; United Kingdom
- Original language: English

Production
- Executive producers: Nancy Abraham; Lisa Heller
- Producers: Dan Reed; Owen Phillips
- Cinematography: Dan Reed
- Editor: Jules Cornell
- Running time: 236 minutes (complete version); 189 minutes (British version)
- Production company: Amos Pictures

Original release
- Network: HBO (United States)
- Release: January 25, 2019
- Network: Channel 4 (United Kingdom)
- Release: March 6, 2019

Related
- Leaving Neverland 2: Surviving Michael Jackson

Leaving Neverland is a 2019 documentary television film directed and produced by Dan Reed. It focuses on Wade Robson and James Safechuck, who say they were sexually abused as children by the American singer Michael Jackson.

Following its premiere at the Sundance Film Festival on January 25, 2019, Leaving Neverland was broadcast in two parts on HBO. In March 2019, a shortened version was broadcast on Channel 4 in the UK. Leaving Neverland received acclaim, winning the Primetime Emmy Award for Outstanding Documentary or Nonfiction Special, but garnered mixed reviews from viewers.

Leaving Neverland triggered a media backlash against Jackson and a reassessment of his legacy. However, it also boosted sales of his music. Jackson's estate condemned it as a "tabloid character assassination", while Jackson's fans organized protests. A number of rebuttal documentaries seeking to refute the allegations were released. In February 2019, the Jackson estate successfully sued HBO for breaching a non-disparagement clause by distributing the film. Leaving Neverland 2: Surviving Michael Jackson premiered on March 18, 2025.

== Synopsis ==
The director, Dan Reed, described Leaving Neverland as a "study of the psychology of child sexual abuse, told through two ordinary families ... groomed for twenty years by a pedophile masquerading as a trusted friend." In the film, Wade Robson and James Safechuck say that Jackson sexually abused them when they were children–Safechuck from 1988 to 1992 and Robson from 1990 to 1996. They give graphic descriptions of the sex acts in which they say Jackson engaged, including masturbation, oral sex, and anal sex, which they say took place at his home, Neverland Ranch, and other locations.

Robson and Safechuck claim that Jackson said these acts were "romantic", and that they did not realize they were inappropriate until adulthood. Safechuck also claims that Jackson took him shopping for an engagement ring and later held a mock wedding. Safechuck states that around the time of Jackson's criminal trial in 2005, he told his mother that Jackson "wasn't a good person". Safechuck says he began therapy in 2013, thus recalling his trauma for the first time. Safechuck's mother, Stephanie, describes feeling elated and dancing upon hearing of Jackson's death in 2009: "'Oh thank God, he can't hurt any more children!' Those were my thoughts." Robson says Jackson told him to distrust women. Both men said that Jackson tried pushing them away from their families and "brainwashing" them, and that he sent the two men love letters and set up security systems at Neverland to prevent other people from witnessing the abuse.

Safechuck says Jackson eventually replaced him with Brett Barnes; Robson claims he was replaced by the actor Macaulay Culkin, who is two years older, because Jackson preferred prepubescent boys. Culkin himself has always adamantly defended Jackson. Robson says he was given Jackson memorabilia as a child, and is photographed burning the items.

== Background ==
=== Prior accusations against Jackson ===
In 1993, Jackson was accused of molesting a 13-year-old boy, Jordan Chandler. Jackson denied the claims and settled the case out of court for US$23 million. No charges were filed after a criminal investigation due to a lack of evidence and testimony from Chandler. In 1996, Jackson made an out-of-court settlement with the mother of another boy, Jason Francia, for more than US$2 million. Francia had previously told police that Jackson never molested him. The Francias never filed a lawsuit. In 2005, Jackson was criminally tried for several counts of child molestation following concerns raised in the 2003 documentary Living with Michael Jackson. Jackson was acquitted of all charges.

=== Safechuck and Robson lawsuits ===
Robson states in his 2013 complaint that he had suffered two nervous breakdowns in April 2011 and March 2012. In 2013, Robson filed a lawsuit alleging that Jackson had sexually abused him for seven years, beginning when he was seven years old; the suit was reportedly worth US$1.5 billion. The following year, Safechuck filed a lawsuit alleging he was sexually abused by Jackson over four years, beginning when he was ten years old. Safechuck said he realized he was abused by Jackson after seeing Robson on The Today Show in 2013. A probate court dismissed Safechuck's suit in 2017. Both men had previously testified that Jackson never molested them—Safechuck as a child during the 1993 investigation, and Robson as a child in 1993 and as a young adult in 2005.

In 2015, Robson's case against Jackson's estate was dismissed because it was "untimely". His attorney, Maryann Marzano, said they would appeal the ruling and that they would pursue Jackson's business entities. In 2017, it was ruled that the corporations formerly owned by Jackson could not be held accountable for his alleged past actions. The rulings were appealed because of a change in California law that extended that statutes of limitation. On October 20, 2020, Safechuck's lawsuit against Jackson's corporations was again dismissed, with the presiding judge ruling that as a matter of law, Jackson's companies had no duty to keep Safechuck safe from Jackson's alleged predation. On April 26, 2021, Robson's case was dismissed because of a lack of supporting evidence that the defendants exercised control over Jackson. In 2023, an appellate court overturned the decisions and allowed both cases to move to a jury trial. In their combined lawsuits, Safechuck v. MJJ Productions, heading to trial in November 2026, the men demanded $400 million in damages from the estate.

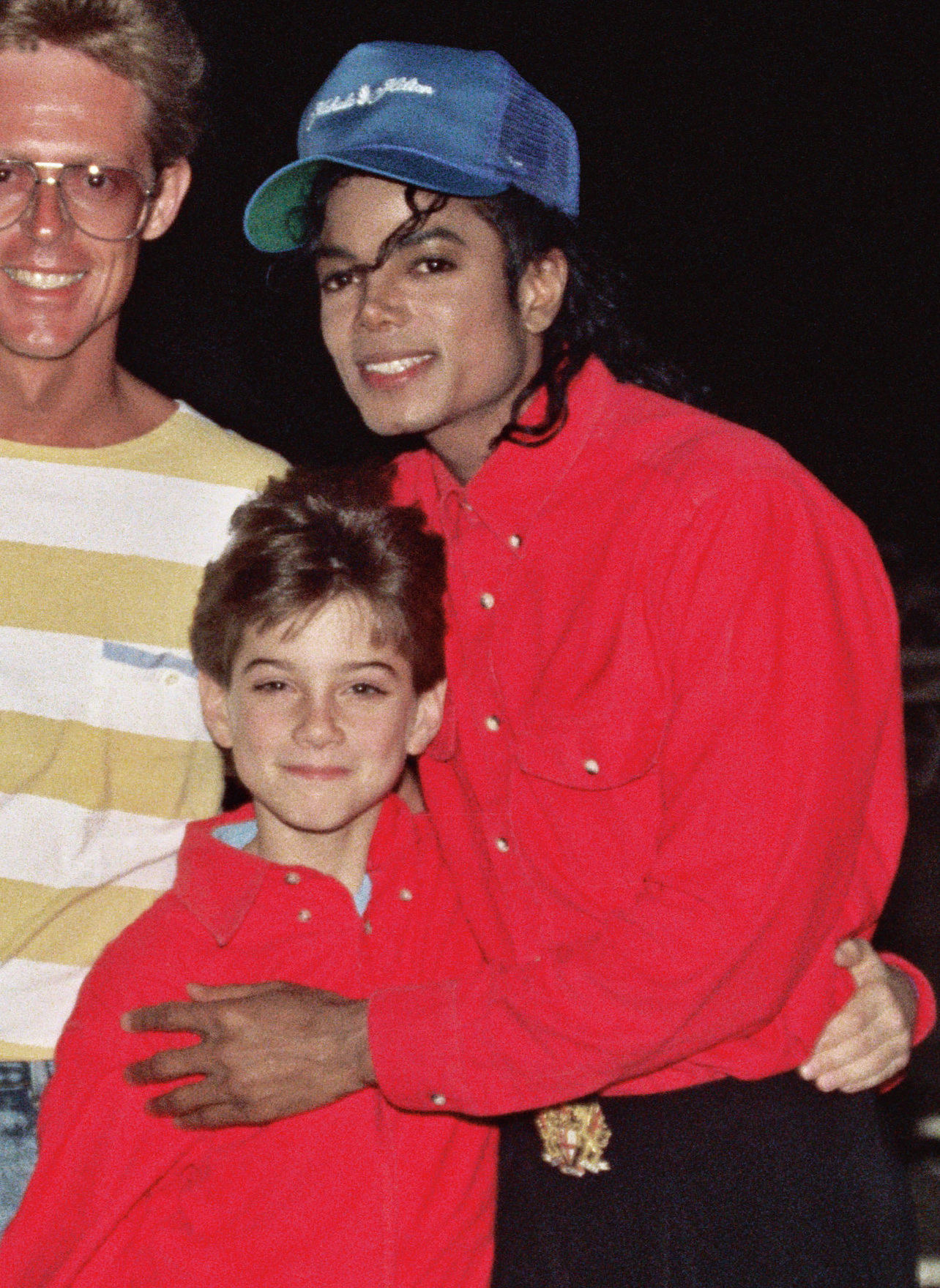
Jackson with James Safechuck in February 1988

== Production ==
Leaving Neverland was conceived by Channel 4 editors. After Reed produced enough material to make a four-hour film, HBO joined the production. He felt the length was necessary to present the story "in a way that makes it fully understandable in all its complexity". The UK version was trimmed by 47 minutes.

In February 2017, Reed and the assistant producer Marguerite Gaudin flew to Hawaii to interview Robson, who agreed to tell his story chronologically and without omitting details. A camera failed shortly after shooting began, but a solution was found; shooting continued until nighttime and continued throughout the second day. Reed traveled to Los Angeles later that week to shoot Safechuck's story in two days. Reed said that Robson, Safechuck, and their families received no financial compensation for the film.

After filming, Reed returned to London and began corroborating the stories. Wondering how Robson's and Safechuck's mothers could have allowed their sons to be abused, he returned to Los Angeles in November 2017 and interviewed their families. The interview in which Safechuck discusses and shows the wedding ring was filmed in July 2018. Reed decided that footage he had shot of former detectives and prosecutors from the 1993 case and the 2005 trial was unnecessary.

Reed was unable to get into contact with Jordan Chandler for the documentary and assumed he preferred to remain private. Reed also contacted Gavin Arvizo, but got no response. Reed also said the Chandler and Arvizo stories could form the basis for a second documentary.

Leaving Neverland was scored by Chad Hobson with the soundtrack released in April 2019 by Redrocca. His approach was to "imagine a walk through a beautiful and magical forest ... But as you travel deeper into the forest it becomes darker, more distorted, the limbs of the trees becoming more twisted and sinister."

== Release ==
Leaving Neverland premiered at the 2019 Sundance Film Festival on January 25, 2019. For television, it was split into two parts, broadcast on March 3–4 on HBO in the US and on March 6–7 on Channel 4 in the UK. The Channel 4 version was edited from four hours to three to create space for commercials. It broke Channel 4 streaming records and became the most downloaded Channel 4 show ever, taking a 45% share of young television audiences. An audience of 2.1 million watched Part 1 on Channel 4, and 1.9 million watched Part 2; after 28-days of catch-up viewing, improving substantially to 5 million and 4 million respectively. In the US, Part 1 drew a 0.4 rating and 1.285 million viewers, the third-largest audience for an HBO documentary in the decade, behind only Going Clear: Scientology and the Prison of Belief and Bright Lights: Starring Carrie Fisher and Debbie Reynolds. Part 2 drew a 0.3 rating and 927,000 viewers in its initial airing.

Kew Media Group sold the documentary to channels in 130 territories. In New Zealand, the first episode was watched by 716,000, making it one of the most-watched broadcasts in the country's history not involving sport or news. Dutch broadcaster VPRO referred viewers to the MIND Korrelatie organization for victims of sexual abuse, and attracted callers in large numbers.

The American broadcast was followed by Oprah Winfrey Presents: After Neverland (recorded March 2, 2019), in which Robson, Safechuck, and Reed were interviewed by Oprah Winfrey before an audience of victims and their families. Winfrey later spoke of the "hateration" she received from Jackson's supporters and others who criticized the film, yet said her support of the accusers has not wavered.

Channel One Russia planned to release the film on nighttime television on March 15, but relegated it to their website, available until March 20, because of "mixed reception, speculation, and aggression from both supporters and opponents of the film". A soundtrack album was released by Redrocca in the US and UK in digital format on April 1, 2019.

Following the film's removal from the Max platform after HBO's settlement with the Jackson estate, it is currently commercially unavailable as of 2026. Reed stated in an interview with Variety that the distribution rights will revert to him in 2029, after which time he may make the film available again.

== Reception ==
=== Critical response ===
On Rotten Tomatoes, Leaving Neverland holds an approval rating of 98% based on 96 reviews, with an average score of 8/10. Its consensus states: "Crucial and careful, Leaving Neverland gives empathetic breadth and depth to the complicated afterlife of child sexual abuse as experienced by adult survivors." On Metacritic, it holds a weighted average of 85 out of 100, indicating "universal acclaim", based on 23 reviews. By contrast, sites such as Rotten Tomatoes reported a mixed audience reception.

In Vanity Fair, Owen Gleiberman described Safechuck and Robson's stories as "overwhelmingly powerful and convincing". Hank Stuever of The Washington Post thought the documentary was "riveting" and "devastating", ending his review with a plea: "Turn off the music and listen to these men." Melanie McFarland of Salon believed the "intent isn't to merely grant these men and their families a platform to air their stories in all their painful fullness, but to place the viewer inside the perspectives of everyone who was taken in by the dream... it does leave the viewer in the thorny clarity of what we know now." Matthew Gilbert of The Boston Globe wrote that Leaving Neverland was not "particularly imaginative", but admired how it chronicled Robson's and Safechuck's emotional narrative: "It accounts for every stage of their respective recoveries, which are still in progress, including their darkest feelings of fear, denial, and shame."

In Entertainment Weekly, Kristen Baldwin gave Leaving Neverland a B grade. She criticized it as "woefully one-sided" and concluded: "As a documentary, Leaving Neverland is a failure. As a reckoning, though, it is unforgettable." In The Hollywood Reporter, Daniel Fienberg wrote that Leaving Neverland is "about the 20+ years... Robson and Safechuck [held secrets, lied, covered up] — and the damage that can do — as it is about the alleged crimes." He concluded: "It's doubtful you'll feel exactly the same after watching." The Daily Telegraph awarded it five out of five, describing it as "a horrifying picture of child abuse".

David Fear wrote in Rolling Stone: "By offering these men a forum, this doc has clearly chosen a side. Yet the thoroughness with which it details this history of allegations, and the way it personalizes them to a startling degree, is hard to shake off." IndieWire's David Ehrlich wrote that Leaving Neverland was "dry" and "hardly great cinema", but a "crucial document for a culture that still can't see itself clearly in Michael Jackson's shadow". Alissa Wilkinson described it as "a devastating case" that "may forever" change Jackson's legacy. In the Chicago Sun-Times, Richard Roeper described it as a "devastating and undeniably persuasive film". Leaving Neverland earned the Primetime Emmy Award for Outstanding Documentary or Nonfiction Special and the TCA Award for Outstanding Achievement in News and Information.

=== Backlash against Jackson ===
Leaving Neverland led to a media backlash against Jackson. Commentators suggested Jackson's music could fall from favor, similarly to the work of convicted child sexual abuser Gary Glitter. Reed said he was not interested in this debate, and said: "I'm not about cancelling Jackson. But I think people should know that he was, at times, a monster to children."

All Cogeco-owned radio stations in Canada pulled Jackson's music from their playlists, but later re-added it. NH Radio in the Netherlands and MediaWorks New Zealand, New Zealand Media and Entertainment and Radio New Zealand also pulled Jackson's music, but some New Zealand radio stations eventually re-added it, citing "positive listener survey results". A 1991 episode of The Simpsons guest-starring Jackson, "Stark Raving Dad", was pulled from circulation; the co-writer, Al Jean, said he believed Jackson had used the episode to groom boys for sexual abuse. A London concert produced by Jackson's collaborator Quincy Jones removed Jackson's name and album titles from its advertisements; the organizers said the modified artwork reflected the show's inclusion of Jones's repertoire unrelated to his work with Jackson. "Weird Al" Yankovic dropped his parodies of Jackson's music from his Strings Attached Tour.

The film producer Jodi Gomes said she and the Jackson family had been working on a new documentary about the Jackson 5 for their 50th anniversary, but that it was canceled after the broadcast of Leaving Neverland. However, Gomes believed Jackson's legacy would continue "from this generation to the next". Items of Jackson's clothing and a Jackson poster were removed from the Children's Museum of Indianapolis, but Jackson's photographs from the museum's Ryan White exhibit were kept. The fashion house Louis Vuitton canceled Jackson-inspired products planned for its 2019 collections. The American gymnast Katelyn Ohashi removed Jackson's music and Jackson-inspired dance moves from her floor routine at the 2019 PAC-12 Championships. The city council of Brussels cancelled plans to dress the Manneken Pis sculpture in Jackson's signature clothing.

=== Aftermath ===
Despite the negative publicity, Jackson's honors were not rescinded, as had happened following sexual assault allegations made against Bill Cosby and Harvey Weinstein, and there were no mass calls to stop playing his music, as had happened following allegations against Gary Glitter and R. Kelly. Jackson's combined music sales, including his work with the Jackson 5, increased by 10%. Streams of his music and videos increased by 6%, rising from 18.7 million between February 24 and 26 to 19.7 million between March 3 and 5. His videos were viewed 22.1 million times, an increase of roughly 1.2 million from the week prior, and three of his albums re-entered the UK iTunes chart.

In June 2019, around the time of the tenth anniversary of Jackson's death, various industry executives said that his legacy would endure. Darren Julien, president of Julien's Auctions, which has sold millions of dollars' worth of Jackson memorabilia, said Jackson "still commands prices compared to most any other celebrity". The senior Billboard editor Gail Mitchell said she interviewed about 30 music executives who believed Jackson's legacy could withstand the controversy. In a Guardian article reassessing Jackson's legacy, the biographer Margo Jefferson expressed her support for Jackson's accusers and concluded: "The task is to read the art and the life fully as they wind and unwind around each other, changing shape and direction."

Reed said he had received abuse and death threats from Jackson fans. In January 2019, he said: "There must be dozens of men out there who have been sexually abused by [Jackson] ... others will see this film and come out." A follow-up documentary, Leaving Neverland 2: Surviving Michael Jackson, premiered on Channel 4 on March 18, 2025. It followed Robson and Safechuck as they took their allegations against Jackson to trial.

=== Lawsuit against HBO and public arbitration ===
On February 7, 2019, shortly before broadcast, Howard Weitzman, attorney for the Jackson estate, wrote a letter to HBO chief executive Richard Plepler criticizing Leaving Neverland as journalistically unethical. The letter asserted that HBO is "being used as part of Robson's and Safechuck's legal strategy [both of which are currently seeking appeals]", and that Reed intentionally did not interview anyone who detracted from the story. The letter said that the two accusers had been caught lying in testimony, and the documentary would only bolster their credibility. "We know that this will go down as the most shameful episode in HBO's history," the letter said.

On February 21, the Jackson estate sued HBO for violating a non-disparagement clause in a 1992 contract by agreeing to run the documentary. The suit sought to compel HBO to litigate the issue in a public arbitration process and claimed that the estate could be awarded $100 million or more in damages. The suit accused HBO of fabricating lies with a financial motive. HBO did not stop the airing of the documentary.

The suit sought to compel HBO to participate in a non-confidential arbitration that could result in US$100 million or more in damages being awarded to the estate. HBO denied claims of a breach of contract and filed an anti-SLAPP motion against the estate. Judge George Wu denied HBO's motion to dismiss the case, allowing the Jackson estate to compel arbitration, but granted HBO's motion to stay the arbitration proceedings with the Jackson estate pending HBO's appeal to the US Court of Appeals for the Ninth Circuit. On December 14, 2020, a three-judge panel of the Ninth Circuit upheld the lower court ruling favoring the Jackson estate. The sex abuse lawsuits Robson and Safechuck filed which were based on the allegations they later described in Leaving Neverland would eventually be dismissed as well. On February 28, Plepler resigned from HBO. He was rumored to have chafed under the leadership of John Stankey, WarnerMedia's new chief. The Jackson estate said Plepler "must have known" about the 1992 contract, since he had been senior vice president of communications then. It was reported in September 2019 that Plepler resigned three days after an unnamed shareholder wrote a letter criticizing, among other things, Plepler's greenlighting of Leaving Neverland, arguing that it opened the company to lawsuits.

On May 2, HBO lawyers Daniel Petrocelli and Theodore Boutrous filed an opposing motion arguing that the contract had expired once both parties had fulfilled their obligations. HBO contended that the estate's interpretation of the clause as conferring perpetual immunity from disparagement, even in death, was excessively broad. They argued that such interpretation would "run afoul of the public policy embodies in numerous California statutes to protect children from sexual abuse" and "legitimize the creation of a category of wealthy, powerful or famous individual who could... preserve for themselves via contract posthumous control over how they are portrayed and described in a way that ordinary citizens cannot." Bryan Freedman, an attorney for Jackson estate, responded, "If HBO thinks the contract does not apply or is expired then why are they opposing adjudicating it? The reason why is because they know they were complicit in this one-sided farce of a money grab that clearly violates the agreement... Let this be a warning to all talent that HBO will disregard the truth and distribute fictitious one-sided content in violation of the artists' rights it promised to protect."

The Jackson estate aimed to have a Los Angeles Superior Court judge compel arbitration proceedings before the American Arbitration Association. HBO said there was no enforceable agreement that pertained to Leaving Neverland. It argued that an over-reading of the 1992 contract would violate both its due process rights and the First Amendment; under the Federal Arbitration Act, the federal judge had to decide the "gateway issues of validity and arbitrability". The Jackson estate called this argument "classic tautology" and that it "assumes the very conclusion that HBO wants an adjudicator to reach in this dispute, i.e., that there are no remaining obligations under the Agreement".

On the recommendation of Judge George Wu, HBO filed a SLAPP (Strategic Lawsuit Against Public Participation) motion against the estate on August 29. It pointed to the "extraordinary" origins of the case. The estate argued that its petition is a federal issue, under the Federal Arbitration Act, hence the California SLAPP law should not take precedence. They said, "Breaching an agreement by refusing to arbitrate is not constitutionally protected activity. And even if it were, the Jackson Estate has shown a probability of success on that claim." The SLAPP law provides an automatic right to an immediate appeal, which may bring the case to the Ninth Circuit.

On September 19, Judge Wu tentatively denied HBO's motion to dismiss the estate's lawsuit. John Branca, co-executor of the estate, said HBO had been trying to suppress the other side of the story. "I've never seen a media organization fight so hard to keep a secret," Branca said. The following day, Judge Wu gave a final ruling to deny HBO's motion to dismiss the case, granting the Jackson estate's motion to compel arbitration.

On October 21, 2019, HBO filed a notice of appeal to the United States Court of Appeals for the Ninth Circuit, seeking appellate review of the District Court's order granting the Jackson estate's motion to compel arbitration. Shortly after, HBO applied for a stay of the arbitration proceedings. On November 7, HBO was granted its motion to stay the arbitration proceedings with the Jackson estate pending HBO's appeal to the Ninth Circuit. On December 14, 2020, HBO lost an appellate bid to avoid arbitration, as a three-judge panel for the Ninth Court Court of Appeal upheld the lower court decision favoring the Jackson estate. In October 2024, the case was dismissed by both parties resulting in Max removing the film and never to return to the platform.

== Criticisms of allegations ==
In January 2019, the Jackson estate issued a press release condemning the film as a tabloid-style character assassination, stating that "The two accusers testified under oath that these events never occurred. They have provided no independent evidence and absolutely no proof in support of their accusations." On the day of the HBO premiere of Leaving Neverland: Part One, the estate posted Live in Bucharest on YouTube. The next day, to coincide with the broadcast of Part Two, the estate posted another concert film, Live at Wembley July 16, 1988.

Fans of Jackson demanded the Sundance Film Festival cancel the screening. At the Sundance premiere, Robson and Safechuck said they had received death threats from fans. Fans organized an internet campaign, protests outside Channel 4's office, and a crowdfunded campaign placing posters with the slogan "Facts don't lie. People do." on public transport. On March 13, Transport for London announced it would remove the adverts after the charity The Survivors Trust complained that they could discourage victims of sexual abuse from coming forward. On February 27, the Southern Christian Leadership Conference wrote a letter asking HBO to reconsider airing the film, calling it a "posthumous lynching".

Several men who were friends of Jackson as children, including some who were named in the documentary as other victims, defended him and denounced the documentary. American actor Corey Feldman called it "one-sided" and said Jackson never approached him inappropriately. He later said that his comments "[weren't] meant in any way to question the validity of the victims". Feldman told Rolling Stone that his relationship with Jackson was "the standard grooming process that [Robson and Safechuck] describe ... everything was similar [to what happened to me] up until the sexual part". American singer Aaron Carter, a friend of Jackson as a child, said in 2019 "there was one thing that he [Jackson] did that was a little bit inappropriate"; however, after the release of Leaving Neverland, said the incident had not been sexual. He remembered Jackson as "an amazing guy" and said his accusers were "full of crap". Barnes and Culkin, whom the documentary suggests replaced Robson and Safechuck when Jackson "pushed them out", also denied any inappropriate behavior from Jackson. Culkin restated that he had never seen inappropriate behavior from Jackson, and said he had no reason to conceal anything now that Jackson had died.

English singer Boy George expressed skepticism about the documentary: "It's just taken almost for granted that this is what happened and therefore we all should accept it." American singer Madonna, who was a friend of Jackson, told British Vogue: "I don't have a lynch-mob mentality, so in my mind, people are innocent until proven guilty ... Are there people asking for money, is there some kind of extortion thing happening?" Joey Fatone of the pop group NSYNC, who had worked with Robson at the 2001 MTV Video Music Awards, also expressed skepticism: "[At the time] it seemed like nothing was going on, that's the whole thing. To come out later on and have these repercussions, it's kind of weird and interesting because you never know what's true."

Jackson biographer Mike Smallcombe argued that Safechuck's claims of sexual abuse at Neverland's train station at age 10 between 1988 and 1992 could not be true because the train station had not been built until 1994, when Safechuck was at least 16. Reed responded that the accusers had misremembered the year the abuse ended, that Safechuck was present at Neverland before and after the construction of the station, and that it was "just one of the many locations where James remembers sexual activity taking place". This contradicts Safechuck's claim that the abuse ended in 1992 because he grew too old. Smallcombe dismissed Reed's response, and criticized the documentary for omitting the debts they say that Robson and Safechuck owe Jackson's estate in court costs.

Another Jackson biographer, J. Randy Taraborrelli, felt that Jackson's friendships with children were "weird", but saw nothing sexual about them. He said he would have felt that Robson and Safechuck were telling the truth "if it wasn't Michael they were talking about". Bill Whitfield, Jackson's former head of security, also disputed Robson's account that Robson and his wife visited Jackson at his home in Las Vegas in 2008, and said that Robson had never visited.

=== Rebuttal documentaries ===
A number of rebuttal documentaries seeking to refute the allegations were produced. A 30-minute documentary, Neverland Firsthand: Investigating the Michael Jackson Documentary, was released on YouTube on March 30, 2019. It was directed by journalist Liam McEwan and features interviews with Jackson's family and colleagues. It featured Jackson's niece, Brandi Jackson, who dated Robson from 1991 onward for years. She contested Robson's claims and the narrative of Michael always being around him.

Another documentary challenging the film, Michael Jackson: Chase the Truth, was released on August 13, 2019. That day, parts of Robson's 2016 video deposition were released in an online video essay, Lies of Leaving Neverland. The essay argues that his deposition statements contradict statements he made in Leaving Neverland. Another documentary, Square One: Michael Jackson, examined the first accusations made against Jackson and made a case for his innocence, portraying him as a victim of tabloid journalism.

== Awards and nominations ==
Award	Category	Nominee(s)	Result	Ref.
British Academy Television Awards	Best Factual Series or Strand	Leaving Neverland	Won	
British Academy Television Craft Awards	Best Director: Factual	Dan Reed	Nominated	
British Academy Television Craft Awards	Best Editing: Factual	Jules Cornell	Nominated	
Cinema Eye Honors	Outstanding Achievement in a Nonfiction Film for Broadcast	Leaving Neverland	Won	
Dorian Awards	TV Current Affairs Show of the Year	Leaving Neverland	Won	
IDA Documentary Awards	Best Multipart Documentary	Leaving Neverland	Won	
Peabody Awards	Documentary	Leaving Neverland	Nominated	
Primetime Emmy Awards	Outstanding Documentary or Nonfiction Special	Leaving Neverland	Won	
Primetime Emmy Awards	Outstanding Directing for a Documentary/Nonfiction Program	Dan Reed	Nominated	
Primetime Emmy Awards	Outstanding Picture Editing For Nonfiction Programming	Jules Cornell	Nominated	
Primetime Emmy Awards	Outstanding Sound Editing for Nonfiction Programming (Single or Multi-Camera)	Ross Millership and Poppy Kavanagh	Nominated	
Primetime Emmy Awards	Outstanding Sound Mixing For Nonfiction Programming (Single or Multi-camera)	Matt Skilton and Marguerite Gaudin	Nominated	
Producers Guild of America Awards	Outstanding Producer of Non-Fiction Television	Leaving Neverland	Won	
Television Critics Association Awards	Outstanding Achievement in News and Information	Leaving Neverland	Won	

== See also ==
- Man in the Mirror: The Michael Jackson Story
- The Jacksons: An American Dream
