= FBI files on Michael Jackson =

The Federal Bureau of Investigation (FBI) kept records on the American singer Michael Jackson, which were declassified and released to the public under the Freedom of Information Act on December 22, 2009, following Jackson's death. In response to perceived threats against Jackson and allegations of child sexual assault made against him, the FBI made several investigations into Jackson, none of which led to charges.

Between 1993 and 2005, Jackson was investigated by California law enforcement agencies due to allegations of child abuse; the FBI provided technical and investigative assistance. They also investigated threats made against Jackson and others by Frank Paul Jones, who was later imprisoned. The FBI found no evidence of criminal conduct on Jackson's part.

The FBI files comprise over 600 pages; 351 pages were released publicly, divided into eight parts. They include copies of letters from members of the public commenting on Jackson's performances, newspaper clippings, and various documents reporting that Jackson was the target of threats and extortion attempts.

== Content ==
The FBI began monitoring Jackson in 1992, when they investigated death threats against him made by a man obsessed with Jackson's sister Janet. In 1993, following the first allegations of child sexual assault by Jackson, FBI agents began looking into Jackson's alleged involvement with young children; the FBI investigations continued for almost 10 years.

In 2004, the FBI assisted with investigations into child abuse allegations against Jackson. At Jackson's trial in 2005, Santa Maria law enforcement contacted the FBI as they feared the trial could be a "soft target" for terrorism. According to the files, the FBI ended its investigations into Jackson in 2005 and found no evidence of criminal conduct on his part. The FBI files released on Jackson comprise eight parts.

=== Part one: British tabloid articles regarding an alleged indecent phone call with a child ===
Part one consists of 10 pages, primarily legal documents and tabloid newspaper clippings, internal FBI correspondence, and a copy of Section 43 of the United Kingdom's Telecommunications Act 1984. The clippings allege that Jackson and the British DJ Terance George had phone sex in 1979 when Jackson was 20 and George was 13. The FBI files show that it was George who contacted Jackson and that George had attempted to rekindle his friendship with Jackson when he visited London but was rebuffed by Jackson's security.

According to the files, the clippings and extract from the Telecommunications Act were supplied “for information only” by a redacted British law-enforcement agency, who indicated they were not taking action.

=== Part two: Forensics analysis of Jackson's computers ===
Part two consists of 44 pages detailing the forensics analysis of Jackson's computers and hard drives. During investigatory raids on Jackson's properties in 2003, 16 hard drives were confiscated in total. What the FBI's Computer Analysis Response Team (CART) found on these hard drives was in a report addressed to Sheriff Jim Anderson, dated April 5, 2004. The FBI found nothing incriminating on the drives, and the computer history contained no record of accessing or searching for illegal material. On March 29, 2004, CART forwarded 4 DVDs to the Forensic Audio Video Image Analysis Unit (FAVIAU) with file formatting problems and requested that the files be converted to a readable format. Some time after the conversion, it was noted that there were no "outstanding leads or evidence items".

=== Part three: LAPD seeks Mann Act assistance, investigators determine credibility of other allegations ===
Part three consists of 59 pages providing an early timeline for the first child abuse allegations against Jackson. On September 7, 1993, the Los Angeles Police Department (LAPD) asked the FBI to help prosecute Jackson under the Mann Act. On September 8, 1993, the United States Attorney declined to prosecute Jackson for violating the Mann Act.

The remaining pages cover various allegations against Jackson throughout 1993, with many pages replicated from part one of the files. Other files show that the FBI provided logistical support to LAPD detectives traveling to the Philippines to interview two former Jackson employees. This support included arranging transportation and hotels and accompanying the detectives to their first interview. Newspaper clippings of press reports of this visit are also included in the files. The couple interviewed alleged Jackson owed them back pay.

Other accusations include a claim that Jackson sexually molested two Mexican boys in 1985 or 1986. The writer, whose name is redacted, said that the allegation was being investigated by the FBI and alleged that the government assisted in a cover-up because Jackson was to receive an honor in 1984 from the President at the White House. After checking their archives and investigating themselves, the FBI concluded that no such reference was found.

=== Part four: Video analysis ===
Part four consists of nine pages on the analysis of a multi-generational poor-quality VHS tape seized by US Customs in West Palm Beach, Florida, in 1995. The tape was labeled "Michael Jackson’s Neverland Favorites An All Boy Anthology"; the files do not mention that Jackson owned the tape or had any connection to it. The investigation of whether it contained child pornography was concluded on January 24, 1997. No charges were filed.

=== Part five: 2003–2005 period accusations ===
Part five consists of 18 pages covering a brief timeline of the 2003–2005 accusations from an indictment, to arrest, to CART and the FBI's investigatory assistance, to the trial's acquittal. The documents relate that police in Santa Barbara, where Jackson stood trial, contacted the FBI because they feared he might become a terrorist target. At the molestation trial, the FBI concluded there was little risk. They noted that a Nation of Islam follower and a New Black Panther Party member, both unnamed in the file, attended one court appearance. Jackson was acquitted of all charges on June 13, 2005.

=== Part six: Death threats and extortion attempts ===
Part six, the largest, is 199 pages long. It covers death threats against Jackson and others by Frank Paul Jones, who served two years in prison for sending a letter that read: "I am going to Washington, D.C., to threaten to kill the president of the United States, George Bush." The letter also threatened Jackson, about whom Jones wrote, "I will personally attempt to kill if he doesn't pay me my money." Jones was arrested for trespassing on June 22, 1992 at the Jackson family compound in Encino, California.

=== Part seven: Law enforcement interviews the 1993 accuser for 2005 trial ===
The shortest section of the documents, part seven consists of five pages. This section involves investigators’ attempt to pursue the 1993 accuser as a second case to coincide with the 2003 accuser. After a meeting in June 2004 between Santa Barbara Assistant District Attorneys (SBADAs) and the FBI's Behavioral Analysis Unit (BAU), it was concluded that a federal case could still be pursued with the 1993 accuser. A conference call was held on August 30, 2004, when it was agreed that Santa Maria RA should open a case on the 1993 accuser.

A meeting was held in New York in an attempt to persuade the 1993 accuser to testify for the 2005 trial. The 1993 accuser informed the two agents in the meeting that he would not testify against Jackson and would "legally fight any attempts to do so". A document dated December 9, 2004 indicates that the case was closed, citing "no outstanding leads or evidence items".

== Media reaction ==
Brian Oxman, a former lawyer for the Jackson family, said the files contained no evidence that Jackson committed any crime and that it was "a vindication". A former FBI investigator said that, due to local law enforcement's limited capabilities, it was common that the FBI get involved as they were well resourced to assist.

In 2013, a London tabloid, the Sunday People, alleged that "secret FBI files" revealed that Jackson had paid millions in hush money to dozens of boys he had abused. The reports were received with skepticism. The CNN reporter Drew Griffin said it "sounds like recycled tabloid reports from 20 years ago". Thomas Mesereau, Jackson's 2005 criminal defense attorney, dismissed the report as "a bunch of utter nonsense". The journalist Diane Dimond, a critic of Jackson, said: "It is obvious the paper took this old story and proceeded to make it seem new by adding numbers to it ... The problem is there's no evidence to back up the claim that Jackson made that many payoffs."

== See also ==
- Trial of Michael Jackson
