= 1993 Michael Jackson sexual abuse allegations =

First accusations against American singer

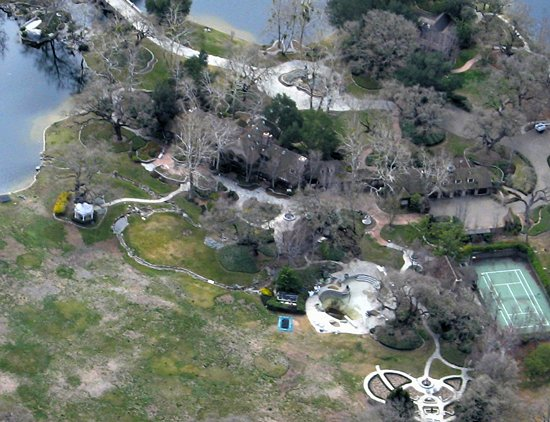
Jackson's Neverland Ranch home, where the sexual abuse was alleged to have taken place

In 1993, Evan Chandler, a dentist and screenwriter based in Los Angeles, accused the American singer Michael Jackson of sexually abusing his 13-year-old son, Jordan Chandler. Jackson had befriended Jordan after renting a vehicle from Jordan's stepfather. Though Evan initially encouraged the friendship, he confronted his ex-wife, who had custody of Jordan, with suspicions that the relationship was inappropriate. Jordan initially said Jackson had not acted inappropriately, but later supported his father's allegations.

In August 1993, Chandler demanded money from Jackson, threatening to go to a criminal court, but no agreement was reached. After Jordan told a psychiatrist that Jackson had molested him, the Los Angeles Police Department began a criminal investigation. The investigation found no physical evidence against Jackson. As the second leg of Jackson's Dangerous World Tour began, news of the allegations broke and received worldwide media attention. Jackson canceled the remainder of the tour, citing health problems arising from the scandal. Jackson's sister La Toya Jackson spoke out against Jackson, but produced no evidence and withdrew the accusation, saying she had been forced to make it by her husband.

In September 1993, the Chandlers filed a lawsuit against Jackson. They and Jackson reached a financial settlement in January 1994; Jackson and his legal team stressed that this was not an admission of guilt. In September 1994, the investigation closed after the Chandlers declined to cooperate, leaving the case without its main witness.

The allegations damaged Jackson's public image, health, and commercial standing. Several of his endorsement deals were canceled, including his decade-long Pepsi endorsement. Further allegations of abuse by Jackson led to the People v. Jackson trial in 2005, in which Jackson was acquitted.

== Background ==
Evan Chandler, c. 1993

In May 1992, Michael Jackson's car broke down in Los Angeles and was towed to Rent-a-Wreck, which was owned by David Schwartz. Schwartz contacted his wife, June Chandler-Schwartz, who arrived with her twelve-year-old son, Jordan Chandler. Jordan was already a fan of Jackson and had briefly met him as a young child. Jackson and Jordan subsequently became friends, and Jackson invited Jordan, June, and Jordan's stepsister Lily to spend time at Neverland Ranch and accompany him on several trips.

The following year, Jackson became a frequent visitor at the Chandler family home. According to June Chandler's testimony at Jackson's 2005 trial, he regularly telephoned Jordan, visited the family in Santa Monica, and shared Jordan's bed at their home on about thirty nights. June also testified that, during a trip to Las Vegas, Jackson repeatedly asked to let Jordan sleep in his bed. After she initially refused, Jackson insisted that there was "nothing wrong" with the arrangement and eventually she relented. June later testified that she was given a gold Cartier bracelet in return the next day.

In May 1993, Jackson invited June, Jordan, and Lily to accompany him to Monaco for the World Music Awards. After they returned to the United States, the National Enquirer published a story titled "Michael's New Adopted Family", featuring photographs of Jackson with the Chandlers. According to biographer J. Randy Taraborrelli, the publicity alarmed Jordan's father, Evan Chandler, who believed the relationship had become too close and feared that the attention could make his son a target for kidnappers.

According to Randall Sullivan, Evan initially encouraged Jackson's friendship with Jordan and even invited him to stay at his home. Jackson spent five days there and shared a bedroom with Jordan and his younger half-brother. Evan later said that this visit was when he first became suspicious of possible sexual misconduct, although he acknowledged that he never witnessed any sexual activity and never saw Jackson or Jordan unclothed. By the end of June 1993, Evan had become increasingly concerned about the relationship.

In late June 1993, June Chandler and her son Jordan planned to accompany Michael Jackson on the next leg of his Dangerous World Tour, scheduled to begin in August. Jordan's father, Evan Chandler, opposed the trip and expressed concerns about his son's relationship with Jackson and the diminishing contact between them. On July 2, Evan met with Jordan's stepfather, David Schwartz, to discuss the situation. On July 7, Evan sought a modification of the existing custody arrangements, requesting restrictions on Jordan's contact with Jackson and on travel outside Los Angeles County.

On July 8, Schwartz secretly recorded telephone conversations with Evan concerning the family dispute. During the conversations, Evan discussed his difficulties communicating with Jordan, his disagreements with June over Jackson's involvement in their son's life, and his unsuccessful attempts to arrange a meeting with Jackson. He also referred to his consultations with attorney Barry Rothman and to actions he was considering taking, describing their potential consequences for Jackson's career and June's custody of Jordan. In one passage, Evan warned that making a phone call would end Jackson's career. The recordings did not establish precisely what Evan wanted from Jackson. According to biographer J. Randy Taraborrelli, June and Schwartz played the recordings to Jackson's private investigator, Anthony Pellicano, and attorney, Bert Fields, on July 9. Pellicano subsequently questioned Jordan privately about his relationship with Jackson, according to Pellicano's own account as reported by Taraborrelli.

Fields and Rothman subsequently discussed an arrangement under which Jordan would spend a week with Evan. Fields later stated in a court declaration that he had acted as an intermediary between June and Rothman rather than representing either parent. According to Taraborrelli, June initially decided against sending Jordan for the visit, instead setting out with Jordan and his sister Lily for Neverland Ranch to celebrate Lily's birthday. During a stop at financier Michael Milken's residence, Jackson telephoned Pellicano about the change in plans. Taraborrelli wrote that, following a disagreement, June abandoned the trip and returned to Los Angeles with her children. She subsequently changed her decision and agreed to allow Jordan to stay with Evan for the week.

== Allegations ==
On July 12, Evan Chandler persuaded his former wife, June Chandler, to sign a stipulation barring Jordan from any direct or indirect contact or communication with Michael Jackson. Under the agreement, June relinquished legal custody of Jordan and could visit him only on the condition that he have no contact with Jackson. The stipulation was subsequently filed with Los Angeles Superior Court Judge Kenneth A. Black. June later withdrew from the agreement, saying that she had signed it only because Evan had threatened not to return their son otherwise. Court records described the dispute over Jordan's custody as stemming at least in part from Evan's objections to his son's relationship with Jackson.

On July 16 1993, Jordan Chandler had dental surgery to remove a baby tooth and, under sedation, he disclosed to his father that Michael Jackson had touched his penis. The drug was administered by dental anesthesiologist Mark Torbiner and, according to Diane Dimond, Torbiner's records show that Robinul and Vistaril were administered.

On August 4, Evan and Jordan met Jackson and Pellicano in a Los Angeles hotel room. According to Pellicano's later account, Evan read from a letter in which a therapist discussed hypothetical contacts between an adult and a child in relation to child-molestation laws. Pellicano said that the dispute subsequently became tied to a proposed film-development arrangement worth $20 million, consisting of four $5-million projects.

On August 5, Pellicano met Evan and Barry Rothman, Evan's attorney, for approximately half an hour. Pellicano said he proposed a single film-development deal instead. The following day, August 6, he told Rothman by telephone that such a deal would ordinarily be worth about $350,000. According to Pellicano, Rothman informed him on August 17 that Evan had rejected the proposal. The Los Angeles Times noted that Pellicano produced no recordings or other documentation corroborating his account of these negotiations.

By August 17, Superior Court Judge Kenneth A. Black had voided the July custody arrangement and ordered Evan to return Jordan to his mother, June. That day, Jordan underwent an approximately three-hour interview with Mathis Abrams, a Los Angeles psychiatrist. Abrams reported the allegations to authorities, and the Los Angeles Police Department opened a criminal investigation. Jordan was also interviewed that day by LAPD officers and a county social worker. Case files later obtained by the Los Angeles Times stated that Jordan had difficulty recalling specific times and dates of the alleged incidents, but described him as consistent in his account.

== Investigation ==
News of the investigation became public on August 23, when Los Angeles television station KNBC reported its existence and police confirmed that an inquiry was underway. Although early reports in the Los Angeles Times did not identify the complainant, the British newspaper The Independent had published his full name, Jordan Chandler, by August 26.

On August 24, Jackson, who was in Bangkok for the opening of the third leg of his Dangerous World Tour, issued a statement through his attorney Howard Weitzman denying wrongdoing and expressing confidence that the investigation would clear his name. He also stated his intention to continue the tour. The Jackson family also publicly defended him, issuing a statement rejecting the allegations and reiterating their support during an August 30 press conference.

On August 31, attorney Gloria Allred confirmed that she had been retained to represent Chandler. On September 10, Allred announced her withdrawal from the case without publicly explaining her reasons. Three days later, Larry R. Feldman, a former president of the Los Angeles County Bar Association, was retained as Chandler's attorney.

=== Testimony from other children ===
During the 1993 investigation, police examined Jackson's relationships with several boys. Investigators questioned a group of boys identified by the accuser, reportedly four boys, including the child actor Macaulay Culkin. Brett Barnes, 11, was questioned by investigators at Neverland, while later reporting identifies Wade Robson, 10, as another potential victim located by investigators. On August 25–27, 1993, Barnes and Robson publicly denied any sexual misconduct despite acknowledging that they had shared Jackson's bed; later reporting states that these appearances were arranged by Jackson's private investigator Anthony Pellicano. Robson repeated his denial under oath at Jackson's 2005 trial, but on May 16, 2013, he reversed his account and alleged that Jackson had sexually abused him. Robson said that during the 1993 investigation Jackson called him daily and role-played/rehearsed how he should respond, warning him that disclosure would send them both to prison.

In August 1993, the Los Angeles Times reported that a boy who was at Neverland when police executed search warrants acknowledged having shared Jackson's bed but denied that Jackson had molested him. When prosecutors closed the investigation in September 1994, they said it had uncovered two additional boys who alleged that Jackson had molested them. Neither was publicly identified at the time; one was living outside the United States and had previously made statements generally denying wrongdoing, while the other alleged three incidents and had been receiving therapy. In 2004, retired LAPD detective William Dworin similarly told the Los Angeles Times that two other boys had told detectives that Jackson had touched them inappropriately, although he described their statements as weaker than that of the original accuser.

On November 17, 1993, the Los Angeles Times reported that Jackson attorney Bertram Fields accused LAPD investigators of intimidating children by falsely telling them, among other things, “we have nude photos of you”; Police Commission president Gary Greenebaum rejected the allegations as unfounded. On April 5, 2005, The Guardian reported that Jason Francia, son of Jackson's former maid Blanca Francia, rejected defense suggestions that police had pressured him into accusing Jackson, stating that investigators had asked him to disclose misconduct if it had occurred.

=== Testimony from staff ===
In early September 1993, former Neverland employees Mark and Faye Quindoy publicly offered to testify about what they described as Jackson's unusual behavior around young boys. Contemporary reports noted that Mark Quindoy had left Neverland following workplace disagreements and a pay dispute, and the Los Angeles Times later reported that the couple came forward after Jackson refused to pay approximately $283,000 in back salary they claimed was owed to them. Quindoy alleged that he had seen Jackson fondling boys on at least two occasions. On September 22, the couple were interviewed for nearly four hours in Manila by investigators from the LAPD and Santa Barbara County Sheriff's Department, and said they had provided details of alleged child abuse they claimed to have witnessed.

On November 22, 1993, five former security guards filed a wrongful-termination lawsuit against Jackson, alleging that they had been fired after acquiring firsthand knowledge of his nighttime visits with young boys. One of the guards, Leroy Thomas, further alleged that Jackson had instructed him to retrieve and destroy a Polaroid photograph of a naked boy from Jackson's private bathroom; Thomas described the boy as appearing to be between 10 and 14 years old. Jackson's representatives denied the guards' allegations. On December 2, the guards' attorney, Charles Mathews, held a press conference alleging that his clients had been subjected to systematic harassment and intimidation since their dismissal, including a drive-by shooting and an attempt to run one of them down with a car. Mathews suggested that Jackson's private investigator Anthony Pellicano had orchestrated the campaign. On September 15, 1994, a Superior Court judge ruled that Jackson could invoke the Fifth Amendment to the United States Constitution in the guards' civil suit, allowing him to avoid answering under oath questions concerning allegations of sexual abuse. Jackson's attorneys said that he maintained his innocence but had been advised not to answer because criminal charges remained possible. Mathews also stated that the guards had cooperated with the district attorney's office.

On November 30, 1993, Jackson's longtime chauffeur Gary Hearne was questioned under oath for more than five hours in the Chandler civil case; the deposition was videotaped and transcribed. According to the Los Angeles Times, attorney Larry Feldman subsequently told reporters that Hearne had said he drove Jackson to the Chandler residence “at least 30 times,” dropping him off at night and collecting him the following morning. Hearne also testified about an earlier incident on August 21, the day police searched Jackson's Century City condominium and Neverland: after being sent to the condominium by an aide, Hearne said he received a telephone call from Jackson and private investigator Anthony Pellicano instructing him to collect a briefcase, a suitcase and other items and deliver them to Pellicano's residence. Hearne maintained that he never opened the containers and therefore did not know what they held.

On December 14, 1993, the Los Angeles Times reported that former maid Blanca Francia had told police and prosecutors that she had seen Jackson naked with young boys in a shower and Jacuzzi and had found him sharing a sleeping bag with another boy. In sworn testimony on December 15, Francia additionally described finding a photograph of a young boy who appeared naked except for a sheet covering his genitals. Francia had spoken to authorities before appearing on Hard Copy; she was subsequently paid thousands of dollars by the program. In April 2005, during Jackson's criminal trial, newspapers reported that Francia's son Jason, first questioned by police during the 1993 investigation, had accused Jackson of molesting him and that the Francia family had reached an out-of-court settlement in 1996, reported at more than $2 million.

=== Investigation into Chandler ===
On August 24, 1993, shortly after the investigation into Jackson became public, Jackson's private investigator Anthony Pellicano told reporters that the allegations had followed an unsuccessful extortion attempt. The following day, Pellicano and Jackson's representatives publicly alleged that the boy's father and his attorney had sought $20 million from Jackson and that the allegations had surfaced after Jackson refused to meet their demands. On August 26, the Los Angeles Police Department stated that no extortion complaint had been filed yet and that no investigation into extortion was underway.

On August 30, Jackson's representatives released recordings of the conversations to support their allegations that Evan had attempted to extort money from Jackson. The Los Angeles Times described the recordings as apparently edited and noted that Evan had not specified what he wanted from Jackson. Investigator Ernie Rizzo subsequently alleged that Pellicano had removed passages in which Evan expressed concern for Jordan's welfare. Pellicano and Jackson's attorney Howard Weitzman denied that Pellicano had tampered with the recordings.

Jackson's representatives subsequently reported the alleged extortion to authorities. Pellicano and Weitzman met with investigators, and by September 1 police sources confirmed that an extortion investigation was underway.

After more than five months of investigation, the Los Angeles County District Attorney's Office announced on January 24, 1994 that it would not file attempted-extortion charges against the boy's father. Deputy District Attorney Michael J. Montagna stated that the evidence did not establish that a crime had been committed. Montagna cited two circumstances in particular: Jackson's representatives had not promptly reported the alleged extortion to police, and they had continued negotiating with the father and his attorney for several weeks. Prosecutors concluded that the discussions appeared consistent with efforts to settle a potential civil claim rather than criminal extortion, with Montagna noting that attempts to settle civil disputes without litigation are favored by law.

Pellicano strongly disputed that interpretation. He maintained that Rothman had threatened to publicize the allegations and ruin Jackson unless the father's demands were met, and argued that neither Rothman nor attorney Gloria Allred, who briefly represented the boy, had actually filed a civil lawsuit during their involvement. A civil lawsuit alleging sexual abuse was later filed on the boy's behalf by attorney Larry Feldman.

=== Police raids ===
On August 21, 1993, police searched Jackson's Neverland Ranch in the Santa Ynez Valley and his condominium in Century City, Los Angeles, seizing videotapes and other materials. On August 30, Los Angeles police detectives, accompanied by local officers, searched a suite previously used by Jackson at the Mirage Hotel in Las Vegas. According to a hotel spokesman, the search lasted approximately 30 minutes and no items were seized. On November 8, police searched the Jackson family residence in Encino, where his parents lived, reportedly seizing photographs and other materials. On November 19, investigators also executed search warrants at the offices of a plastic surgeon in Santa Monica and a dermatologist in Beverly Hills, seizing medical records as part of an investigation into whether Jackson had recently altered his physical appearance. Among the seized items were the books Boys Will Be Boys and The Boy: A Photographic Essay, both containing nude photographs of boys. Boys Will Be Boys reportedly contained a handwritten inscription by Jackson himself: "Look at the true spirit of happiness and joy in these boys' faces, this is the spirit of boyhood, a life I've never had and will always dream of. This is the life I want for my children." In a 1995 interview with Diane Sawyer, Jackson was asked about reports of photographs and books depicting nude boys. Jackson said he did not recall them and suggested they may have been unopened items sent by others. Additionally, two individual photographs of unidentified nude boys were found at Neverland and an additional photo of a naked boy was retrieved at the Jackson family home in Encino.

=== Interview with Richard Gardner ===
On October 6, 1993, Jordan Chandler was taken to New York to be evaluated by Dr. Richard A. Gardner, a child psychiatrist known for his work on allegations of child abuse and custody disputes. According to journalist Diane Dimond, Chandler's attorney, Larry R. Feldman, arranged the evaluation, during which Gardner administered psychological tests and conducted a videotaped interview. Chandler described the development of his relationship with Jackson and alleged progressively intimate physical contact, including sexual abuse during their May 1993 trip to Monaco. Dimond subsequently reported that Gardner had found Chandler's allegations credible.

Excerpts from the interview became public in 2005. On March 29, CNN broadcast audio in which Chandler explained that he had found it difficult to resist Jackson's alleged advances because Jackson was an adult, famous and powerful. On April 6, journalist Art Harris explained on CNN that Gardner had been retained by the family's attorney to evaluate Chandler's account rather than provide ongoing therapy. Harris also stated that the interview had been videotaped and that copies of the recordings had subsequently been obtained by a Chandler family member for a book.

On November 16, 1993, the Associated Press reported, citing an anonymous source, that Los Angeles police had obtained a warrant to conduct a physical examination of Jackson to compare his genitalia with a description reportedly provided by Chandler. Jackson's attorney Howard Weitzman said he was unaware of any such warrant and rejected the allegations, while Feldman declined to comment. The Los Angeles Times independently reported that investigators possessed Chandler's description, although police declined to confirm whether a warrant had been issued.

=== Strip search ===
On December 20, 1993, investigators from the Santa Barbara County Sheriff's Department and the Los Angeles Police Department executed a search warrant requiring Michael Jackson to undergo a physical examination to compare his body with a description provided by Jordan Chandler. Jackson's body, including his genitalia, was photographed. On December 22, 1993, in a televised statement broadcast via satellite from Neverland Ranch, Jackson denied the allegations, criticized the media's coverage, and described the police examination as "the most humiliating ordeal of my life". Jackson also said that investigators had sought evidence of vitiligo, a skin condition he had already publicly discussed in February 1993. During a CNN appearance following Jackson's December 22 statement, Jackson's attorney Johnnie Cochran Jr. expressed concern that photographs taken during the examination could be leaked to the media.

On December 23, 1993, Cochran stated that the defense would challenge the admissibility of the nude photographs and described the examination as "really outrageous". Cochran also questioned the purpose of the examination, given Jackson's previously disclosed skin condition. On the same day, Los Angeles and Santa Barbara County authorities declined to comment publicly on the examination, while an anonymous law enforcement source told the Associated Press that investigators had compared the photographs with Chandler's description but declined to say whether they matched.

On January 4, 1994, Chandler's attorney Larry Feldman sought access to the photographs, alternatively requesting another examination or their exclusion from the civil case. Jackson's attorneys later sought their return, but a judge refused; the photographs were kept secured and were never made public.

Accounts differed over whether Chandler's description matched the photographs. On January 27, 1994, Reuters reported that an unidentified source close to Jackson said the photographs did not tally with Chandler's description. In March, Jackson's mother Katherine was subpoenaed before a Los Angeles County grand jury; a source told the Los Angeles Times that investigators were examining whether Jackson's appearance had been altered since Chandler gave his description. The criminal investigation closed without charges on September 21, 1994. During a 1995 ABC interview with Diane Sawyer, Michael Jackson and his then-wife Lisa Marie Presley explicitly denied claims that photographs of Jackson's genitalia matched Jordan Chandler's description.

Officials involved in the investigations later said that the photographs corroborated Chandler's description. In 2004, the Los Angeles Times identified retired LAPD detective William Dworin as having supervised the 1993 investigation and quoted him as saying that "the pictures of Jackson matched the description". During Jackson's 2005 trial, prosecutors sought to introduce the sealed photographs and compare them with a drawing Chandler had made in 1993. Senior Deputy District Attorney Ron Zonen argued that the evidence was relevant, but Judge Rodney Melville excluded it as unfairly prejudicial, particularly because Chandler would not testify and therefore could not be cross-examined.

Lauren Weis, who had been in charge of the Los Angeles criminal investigation in 1993, said in the 2019 podcast Telephone Stories that Chandler's description was accurate, referring to "not just the genitalia, but a particular mark on the underside of his penis". In 2026, former LAPD detectives Rosibel Ferrufino-Smith and Federico Sicard discussed the examination in documentaries. Ferrufino-Smith stated that Chandler had accurately described Jackson's genitalia, while Sicard said the information provided by Chandler had been confirmed.

As of 2024, the photographs taken by police in 1993 were still subject to a court-issued protective order and had not been made public.

== Allegations by La Toya Jackson ==
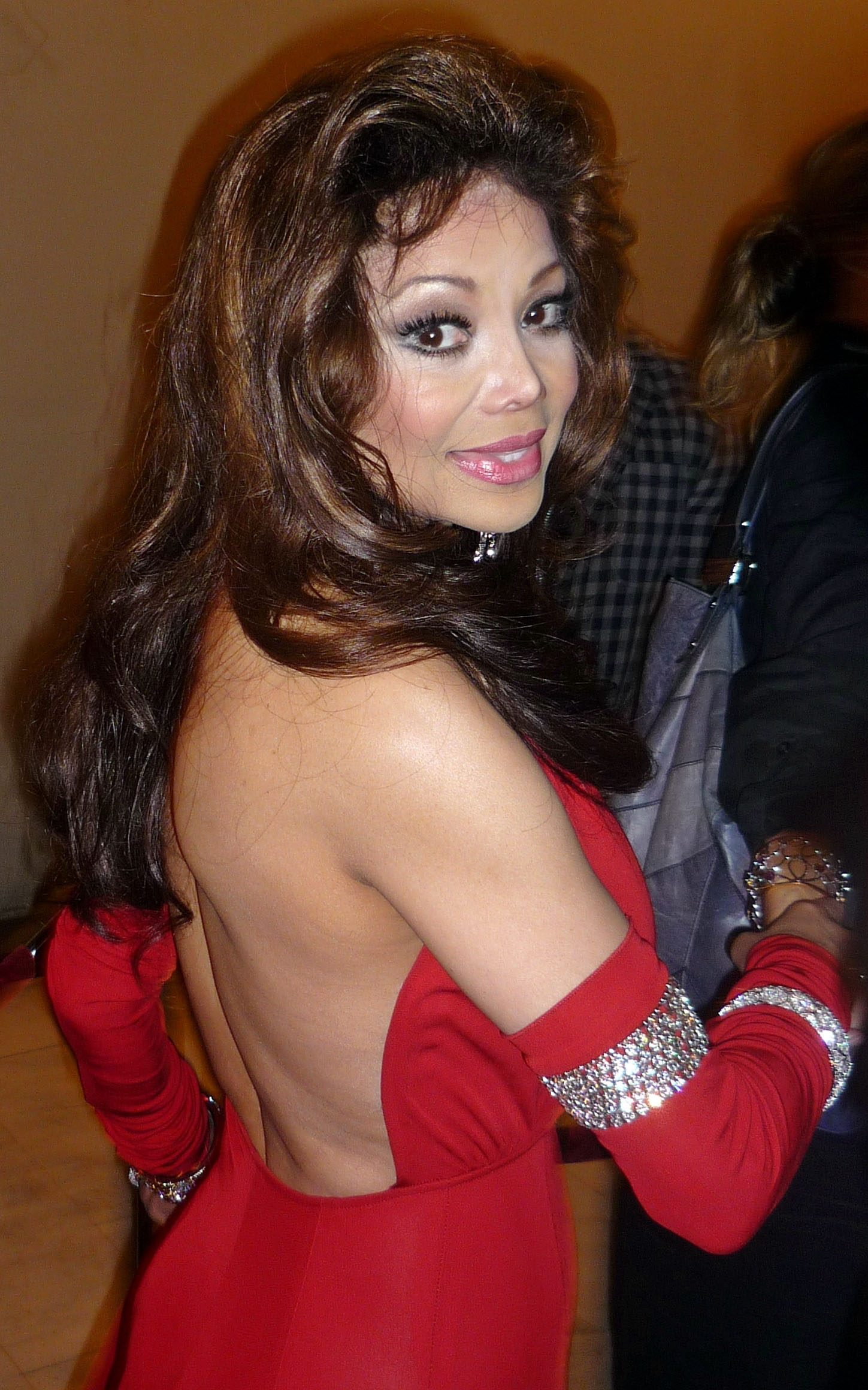
Jackson's sister La Toya Jackson in 2010

On September 2, 1993, Michael Jackson's sister La Toya Jackson, who was estranged from other members of the family, discussed the sexual abuse allegations against him in an interview on NBC's Today. She criticized the public's judgment of her brother before any trial but acknowledged that boys had regularly stayed overnight in his room at the family home. Asked whether she believed the allegations, she replied: "I honestly don't think he'd do anything like that, but we don't know." On December 2, the Los Angeles Times reported that Larry R. Feldman, the attorney representing Jackson's accuser in the civil lawsuit, intended to obtain sworn testimony from La Toya and several other witnesses.

On December 8, 1993, La Toya publicly accused her brother of sexually abusing boys over a period of years during a press conference in Tel Aviv, Israel. According to contemporary reports, she stated: "This has been going on since 1981, and it's not just one child." She also claimed to have seen checks written by Michael to the parents of boys she believed he had abused, saying that her mother, Katherine Jackson, had shown them to her. La Toya suggested that the payments were intended to prevent the families from speaking publicly. Her then-husband and manager, Jack Gordon, separately alleged that Michael had threatened to kill La Toya to prevent her from disclosing the accusations.

Following the December 8 press conference, Feldman said La Toya's allegations were consistent with other information gathered during his investigation, while acknowledging that the reports had not been confirmed. Her deposition, originally scheduled for that week, was postponed because she was outside the United States. Katherine Jackson and other family members publicly rejected La Toya's statements. Her brother Jermaine Jackson alleged that La Toya and Gordon were seeking publicity and financial gain. On December 9, La Toya appeared again on Today, where Katie Couric questioned her about the basis for her accusations. La Toya acknowledged that she had no direct evidence of sexual abuse and, when asked about the checks she had described, stated: "I don't know what they were for." That same day, Michael Jackson's attorney Howard Weitzman rejected her allegations, stating: "I don't believe there's any merit whatsoever to anything she said." Gordon said La Toya was afraid to return to California to give her deposition, while Feldman indicated that he was willing to take her testimony wherever she preferred.

La Toya subsequently disavowed her 1993 statements. During an interview on Larry King Live on March 4, 2003, she attributed the Tel Aviv accusations to her former management, claiming that she had been handed a prepared statement shortly before the press conference and instructed to read it publicly. In a January 2005 interview with 20/20, she said that Gordon had forced her to condemn Michael publicly in 1993 and stated that she believed her brother was innocent. In June 2011, La Toya again discussed the 1993 press conference in an interview on CNN's Showbiz Tonight. She alleged that Gordon had threatened to kill Michael if she refused to make the accusations and had physically assaulted her when she disobeyed him. In a separate interview with The Daily Beast that month, she said she had never believed that Michael was guilty of the allegations made against him in 1993.

== Lawsuit ==
On September 14, 1993, Jordan Chandler and his parents filed a lawsuit (Note: The lawsuit is distinguished from the criminal investigation, which happened simultaneously. The ending of a lawsuit does not preclude the continuation of an investigation.) against Jackson. The lawsuit claimed that Jackson had committed sexual battery, seduction, willful misconduct, intentional infliction of emotional distress, fraud and negligence. In November, Jackson's lawyers asked the case be put on hold for as long as six years or until the criminal case was concluded. Concerns about a civil trial during an ongoing criminal investigation, and prosecutors' access to plaintiffs' civil trial information, stemmed from Jackson's Fifth Amendment rights. Since two grand juries deemed there was insufficient evidence for criminal charges by the end of the investigation, the prosecution could have been able to form the elements of a case around the defense strategy in the trial, creating a situation akin to double jeopardy. (Note: Taraborrelli 1991, pp. 540–541)

Superior Court Judge David M. Rothman ordered Jackson's deposition scheduled before the end of January 1994 but said he might reconsider if Jackson was indicted on criminal charges. Jackson agreed to be deposed on January 18. His attorneys said he was eager to testify, but also said they might oppose the deposition if criminal charges were filed or were still under consideration on his deposition date. They said if charges were filed, they would want the criminal trial to go first. However, when authorities notified Jackson's lawyers that they expected their investigation to continue at least through February, Jackson's team failed to win a delay of the civil case. Rothman denied the motion to delay the civil proceedings until the criminal investigation had been completed, and set March 21, 1994, as the trial start date.

Pellicano said Chandler's negotiations had been an attempt to extort Jackson. To try to demonstrate this, he produced illicit recordings of his negotiations with Rothman. Illicit recordings are generally not admissible as evidence, but may be used in California where extortion is threatened. Jackson's lawyer Howard Weitzman turned over the tapes to the district attorney's office.

On December 17, 1993, Rothman allowed the prosecutors to receive information from Jackson's lawyers and approved discovery information for media disclosure. Both Feldman's and Jackson's camps expressed concerns about Jackson's right to a fair trial being compromised by publicly discussing discovery results. Johnnie Cochran and Weitzman, attorneys representing Jackson, argued that investigators were trying to use the suit to advance their criminal investigation, a technique that should not be allowed.

On January 5, 1994, Jackson reaffirmed his innocence and emphasized the presumption of innocence during a five-minute speech at the 26th NAACP Image Awards, where he received a standing ovation.

On January 24, 1994, prosecutors announced that they would not bring charges against Chandler for attempted extortion, as Jackson's camp had been slow to report an extortion claim to the police and had tried to negotiate a settlement for several weeks. Chandler had made his settlement demand in early August 1993, and the Jackson camp had filed extortion charges against the Chandler camp in late August. In the extortion investigation, a search warrant was never sought to search the homes and offices of Chandler and Barry Rothman. No grand jury convened when both men refused police interviews. (Note: Fischer 2012, p. 268) In contrast, the police had searched Jackson's residences solely based on Jordan's allegations, (Note: Fischer 2012, pp. 266–267) and taken lengths to interview or intimidate witnesses. Weitzman said they had not gone to the police earlier because "It was our hope that this would all go away. We tried to keep it as much in-house as we could."

=== Settlement ===
Jackson's legal team met three times a week at Taylor's home to discuss the case. (Note: Taraborrelli 1991, p. 516) Eventually, they agreed that Jackson was too sick to endure a lengthy trial and that he should settle out of court. (Note: Taraborrelli 1991, pp. 524–528) The lawsuit was settled on January 25, 1994, with $15,331,250 to be held in a trust fund for Jordan, $1.5 million for each of his parents, and $5 million for the family's lawyer, for a total of approximately $25 million. According to a motion passed to Judge Melville in 2004, "the settlement was for global claims of negligence and the lawsuit was defended by Mr. Jackson's insurance carrier. The [carrier] negotiated and paid the settlement, over the protests of Mr. Jackson and his personal legal counsel."

On January 29, 1994, the Associated Press reported that Jackson had requested his insurance company, Transamerica Insurance Group (TIG), contribute to the settlement. A lawyer for TIG, Jordan Harriman, had made a "one-time-only" offer to Jackson on January 13 to resolve his claim. Jackson refused that offer but further negotiations followed. Russ Wardrip, a TIG claims analyst, had sent a January 13 registered letter to Jackson's lawyer, Howard Weitzman:

...acts of sexual activity do not constitute [accidental] bodily injury. Further, acts of sexual activity, especially those against a minor, are inherently intentional, wrongful and harmful. Coverage for such acts is precluded by [the] California Insurance Code.

According to Jackson's attorney Thomas Mesereau, Jackson's insurance company was "the source of the settlement amounts", as noted in a 2005 memorandum in People v. Jackson. The memorandum also noted that "an insurance carrier has the right to settle claims covered by insurance where it decides settlement is expedient and the insured may not interfere with nor prevent such settlements", as established by a number of precedents in California. Defeating the right would involve convincing a court with the power to overrule the precedent that the earlier decision was either wrongly decided or more often, "clearly" wrong (depending on the criteria of the court) or the court must be convinced to distinguish the case. That is, to make the ruling narrower than that in the precedent due to some difference in facts between the current and precedent case while supporting the result reached in the earlier case.

In 2004, Mesereau said: "People who intended to earn millions of dollars from [Jackson's] record and music promotions did not want negative publicity from these lawsuits interfering with their profits. Michael Jackson now regrets making these payments. These settlements were entered into with one primary condition—that condition was that Mr. Jackson never admitted any wrongdoing. [He] always denied doing anything wrong ... Mr. Jackson now realizes the advice he received was wrong." Jackson explained why he had settled: "I wanted to go on with my life. Too many people had already been hurt. I want to make records. I want to sing. I want to perform again ... It's my talent. My hard work. My life. My decision." (Note: Taraborrelli 1991, pp. 544–545) He also wanted to avoid a "media circus". Mesereau later said Jackson regretted settling.

The settlement cannot be used as evidence of guilt in future civil and criminal cases. (Note: Jones 2007, p. 157) In 1994, Larry Feldman said "nobody bought anybody's silence".

== Closure of investigation ==
District Attorney Gil Garcetti said the settlement did not affect criminal prosecution and that the investigation was ongoing. Jordan Chandler was interviewed after the settlement by detectives seeking evidence of child molestation, but no criminal charges were filed. (Note: Sullivan 2012, p. 266) On May 2, 1994, the Santa Barbara County grand jury disbanded without indicting Jackson, while a Los Angeles County grand jury continued to investigate the sexual abuse allegations.

On April 11, 1994, the grand jury session in Santa Barbara was extended by 90 days, allowing DA Sneddon to gather more evidence. Prosecution sources said they were frustrated in their grand jury probe, failing to find direct evidence of the molestation charges. The final grand jury disbanded in July without returning an indictment against Jackson.

The Chandlers stopped co-operating with the criminal investigation around July 6, 1994. Until that time, Jordan Chandler had indicated his possible willingness to testify according to prosecutors. The police never pressed criminal charges. Citing a lack of evidence without Jordan's testimony, the state closed its investigation on September 22, 1994. District attorney Sneddon and Lauren Weis, head of the county DA's Sex Crimes Unit, said that ending the investigation did not reflect any lack of faith in the alleged victim's credibility. The entire investigation involved two grand juries and more than 400 people interviewed over a period of 13 months.

Sneddon said several leads were explored which were later discovered to be false. According to the grand juries, the evidence presented by the Santa Barbara police and the LAPD was not convincing enough to indict Jackson or subpoena him. According to a 1994 report by Variety, a source in contact with the grand juries said that none of the witnesses had produced anything to directly implicate Jackson. According to a 1994 report by Showbiz Today, the grand jurors said that "no damaging evidence was heard" and they heard no "damaging testimony" during the hearings.

In February 1994, the Santa Barbara County Grand Jury convened to assess whether criminal charges should be filed. The Los Angeles County Grand Jury began in March 1994. By 1994 prosecution departments in California had spent $2 million and convened two grand juries, but Jordan Chandler's allegations could not be corroborated. In September, Sneddon and Garcetti said the 18-month investigation had produced no evidence against Jackson. The FBI files on Michael Jackson, released after Jackson's death, noted that the prosecution had no outstanding leads.

== Media coverage ==
=== Jackson ===
The allegations attracted extensive international media attention after becoming public in August 1993. British tabloids dispatched reporters to Los Angeles, while television crews and helicopters gathered around Neverland Ranch. Coverage varied between organizations. The New York Post published the headline "Peter Pan or Pervert?", while Time and Newsweek questioned Jackson's public image in their cover stories. The New York Times initially devoted relatively little coverage to the allegations. Its executive editor, Max Frankel, said it was reluctant to extensively publicize unproven allegations against an individual who had not been charged.

Media commentators questioned the handling of unverified information by television networks. Los Angeles Times writer Howard Rosenberg argued that the coverage had blurred the distinction between mainstream journalism and tabloid reporting. He criticized CBS This Morning for interviewing Hard Copy reporter Diane Dimond and raising an unconfirmed rumor that Jackson had attempted suicide. Rosenberg also noted that some broadcasts repeated tabloid headlines or presented speculative interpretations of the allegations.

In November 1993, after Jackson canceled the remainder of his tour to seek treatment for dependence on painkillers, British journalists searched hotels, hospitals and other locations in an effort to establish his whereabouts. In the same month, the television talk show Geraldo staged a simulated grand jury proceeding concerning the allegations, involving a former judge, attorneys and twelve jurors, although Jackson had not been charged.

A December 1993 nationwide survey by the Times Mirror Center for the People & the Press found that 57% of respondents believed news about Jackson's personal problems had received excessive media coverage. The Western Regional NAACP accused the media of excessive and prejudicial coverage, expressing concern that Jackson was effectively being tried in the press. The organization emphasized that it was taking no position on the truth of the allegations and announced a review of news coverage of African Americans. On December 22, Jackson delivered a televised statement denying the allegations and criticizing their portrayal in the media. Larry Feldman, the Chandler family's attorney, responded that Jackson was himself using the publicity to influence prospective jurors. The statement was carried live by numerous television networks.

=== Chandler family ===
The media attention also extended to Jordan Chandler and his parents, Evan and June Chandler. Although most American news organizations followed policies against identifying minors who alleged sexual abuse, the New York Daily News published Jordan's name, while the British tabloid The Sun printed photographs of him with Jackson. Time and Newsweek published photographs in which his face had been electronically obscured. By August 26, The Independent had also identified Jordan by name. The Associated Press reported that his name and photograph had appeared in newspapers in Britain, France, Italy and Germany.

Even news organizations that withheld Jordan's name sometimes disclosed information from which he could be identified. Reports described his parents' divorce and custody dispute, identified Evan's occupation and professional connections, and discussed June's disagreements with him over their son's relationship with Jackson. Television reporters filmed outside Evan's residence and visited both parents' workplaces. Los Angeles Times critic Howard Rosenberg criticized these practices for compromising the child's anonymity.

=== Leaks and paid reporting ===
In August 1993, confidential reports containing details of Jordan Chandler's allegations were obtained and published by news organizations. On September 2, Los Angeles Superior Court Judge Marcus O. Tucker reminded police and child welfare authorities that disclosing confidential juvenile records without judicial authorization was unlawful. He also criticized the news media for disregarding the confidentiality protections applicable to children. The Los Angeles County Sheriff's Department subsequently investigated the leak at the request of child welfare authorities.

Payments for interviews became another contentious aspect of the coverage. In January 1994, The Washington Post reported that Jackson's former housekeeper Blanca Francia had sold her account to the television program Hard Copy, prompting Jackson's representatives to question her credibility as a paid witness. Investigating the practice for The New Yorker, Jeffrey Toobin obtained correspondence documenting a $100,000 agreement between Hard Copy and the attorney representing five former Jackson security guards, providing for interviews with two of them in November 1993. Toobin also documented a separate $60,000 agreement in February 1994 with former Neverland security employee Charli Michaels. He also examined how payments and competition for exclusive interviews could affect the credibility of potential witnesses and complicate criminal investigations.

The broader commercial pressures behind the reporting were examined in the PBS Frontline documentary Tabloid Truth: The Michael Jackson Story, broadcast on February 15, 1994. The program investigated the competition among television news programs and tabloids, including the purchase of interviews and the transformation of the allegations into a form of commercial entertainment. Erni subsequently analyzed the commercialization of witness testimony as one of the defining features of the media coverage surrounding the allegations.

== Aftermath ==
In February 1994, Los Angeles County District Attorney Gil Garcetti proposed amending a California law that protected sexual assault complainants from being jailed for refusing to testify. His proposal would remove that protection for complainants who had filed or settled civil lawsuits. On February 15, the PBS documentary Frontline: Tabloid Truth – The Michael Jackson Story examined the media coverage of the allegations, including payments made by tabloids to former Jackson employees for their stories.

In December 1994, prosecutors in Santa Barbara County received information about a purported videotape depicting Jackson engaging in sexual activity with a minor. Freelance journalist Víctor Gutiérrez claimed to have seen the recording. In January 1995, investigators interviewed Gutiérrez but were unable to locate the tape or establish its existence. On January 9, journalist Diane Dimond reported the allegations on KABC radio and Hard Copy, citing Gutiérrez. Jackson's representatives denied the allegations.

In 1996, Gutiérrez published Michael Jackson Was My Lover: The Secret Diary of Jordie Chandler, containing further allegations about Jackson's relationship with Jordan Chandler. In the book's acknowledgments, Gutiérrez thanked the North American Man Boy Love Association (NAMBLA). According to Die Tageszeitung, Gutiérrez had attended a NAMBLA conference as a reporter in 1986, where he reportedly heard participants describe Jackson as "one of us". The newspaper reported that Gutiérrez subsequently began investigating Jackson. In 2006, GQ journalist Robert Sandall similarly described Gutiérrez attending a secret conference in Los Angeles in 1986, but stated that he was working undercover with the Los Angeles Police Department. The article did not identify the organization.

Jackson pursued defamation lawsuits against Gutiérrez, Dimond, Paramount Pictures and others over the videotape reports. In April 1998, a jury awarded Jackson $2.7 million against Gutiérrez after he declined to disclose his alleged source or provide supporting evidence. The claims against Dimond and Paramount were dismissed in 1997. In October 1998, the California Court of Appeal upheld the dismissal, finding that the reports accurately described the prosecutors' investigative efforts and that Jackson had not established the actual malice required for his defamation claims. The ruling did not establish that the videotape existed.

In May 1996, Evan Chandler filed a $60 million lawsuit against Jackson, Lisa Marie Presley, ABC and other parties, alleging that Jackson had breached the confidentiality provisions of the 1994 settlement during his June 1995 interview with Diane Sawyer. Jackson denied the allegations.

In an April 2003 interview with Rolling Stone, Lisa Marie Presley recalled that, following the emergence of the 1993 allegations, Jackson contacted her to explain his version of events, presenting the accusations as an attempted extortion. Presley said she initially believed him because she found his account convincing, but acknowledged that her belief had been based on what Jackson had told her. Asked whether she had considered the possibility that the allegations were true, she replied that she had worried about it at the time but could only rely on Jackson's account. Presley also questioned why the accuser's father had accepted a financial settlement, stating that she would not have accepted money if her own child had been sexually abused.

During production of the 2026 biographical film Michael, attorneys for Jackson's estate reportedly discovered a provision in the 1994 settlement prohibiting Jordan Chandler's depiction or mention in a film. According to Variety, scenes addressing the 1993 allegations were removed, requiring extensive reshoots that added an estimated $10–15 million to the production budget and contributed to the film's delayed release.

=== Effect on Jackson's health and career ===
After the allegations became public in August 1993, Jackson continued his Dangerous World Tour. In September, he withdrew from plans to record a song and appear in a promotional video for the film Addams Family Values. According to The Washington Post, Paramount Pictures and McDonald's, which had promotional arrangements connected to the film, were reportedly concerned about the potential consequences of the allegations.

Authorities in Dubai barred Jackson from performing at two concerts scheduled for November, following the circulation of anonymous pamphlets calling for a boycott of his performances and Pepsi products. Officials justified the decision by citing local cultural values.

On November 12, 1993, Jackson canceled the remaining dates of his world tour, announcing that he had developed a dependency on prescription painkillers and needed treatment. He said the medication had initially been prescribed following reconstructive surgery for scalp burns sustained while filming a Pepsi commercial in 1984, and that his use had increased because of the stress associated with the allegations, which he denied. On November 14, PepsiCo announced that its sponsorship of Jackson had ended following the tour's cancellation. A company spokesman attributed the decision to the absence of a tour to sponsor and said that no decision had been made concerning future agreements.

On November 15, Jackson's attorney Bert Fields announced that the singer was undergoing treatment at an undisclosed location outside the United States. Fields described Jackson's condition as serious, saying that his use of painkillers had left him barely able to function intellectually. Jackson's attorneys denied that his departure was intended to avoid questioning in the investigation. In response, Larry Feldman, the attorney representing Jordan Chandler, questioned whether Jackson's condition justified delaying the civil proceedings. Sworn declarations filed on November 18 offered conflicting accounts of Jackson's health. Eve Wagner, an attorney representing Jackson in an unrelated lawsuit, described him as drowsy, unfocused and slurring his speech during a meeting on November 7. Howard Manning Jr., an opposing attorney who questioned Jackson on November 8 and 10, reported no apparent intellectual impairment. Jackson's physician Beauchamp Colclough subsequently reported that his condition had improved, while Feldman sought an independent medical examination to establish whether the reported dependency was genuine. On November 23, a judge rejected Jackson's request to postpone the civil proceedings, although he indicated that the decision could be reconsidered if criminal charges were filed.

On November 24, EMI Music Publishing announced an agreement to administer his ATV Music Publishing catalogue, including publishing rights to numerous Beatles songs. Contemporary estimates of the agreement's value ranged from $90 million to $200 million, and Jackson retained ownership of the catalogue. Jackson returned to the United States on December 10 after receiving treatment abroad. In December, Sega removed him from a planned interactive attraction in Las Vegas. A company spokesman subsequently attributed the decision to the controversy surrounding Jackson.

By January 1994, entertainment industry representatives were questioning Jackson's prospects as a concert performer and commercial endorser. The cancellation of the Dangerous World Tour had resulted in a $20 million lawsuit by concert promoter Marcel Avram, while industry executives expressed concerns about obtaining future sponsorships and cancellation insurance. Nevertheless, Sony Music maintained its support for Jackson, and MTV reported that it had not reduced the broadcast of his music videos because of the allegations.

In September 1994, the Los Angeles Times reported that approximately 200,000 bottles of a proposed Michael Jackson fragrance had been destroyed after retailers proved reluctant to stock the product during the investigation. By contrast, recording industry representatives reported that his music continued to sell strongly, particularly internationally, and anticipated substantial demand for his next album.

In June 1995, Jackson released HIStory: Past, Present and Future, Book I, his first studio album since the allegations. Writing in The Washington Post, Richard Harrington identified "Scream" and "Tabloid Junkie" as criticisms of the media, noting that the latter sampled older rumors rather than reports about the 1993 allegations. The song "D.S." was widely interpreted as an attack on Santa Barbara County District Attorney Thomas W. Sneddon Jr., who had investigated the 1993 allegations. Sneddon said he had not listened to it. "Stranger in Moscow", written during Jackson's 1993 tour stop in Russia, was subsequently described by La Tercera as reflecting his isolation amid the allegations and accompanying media coverage.

=== Further allegations ===
On December 18, 2003, Santa Barbara County prosecutors charged Jackson with nine felony counts, including seven counts involving alleged lewd acts upon a child under 14 and two counts of administering an intoxicating agent with the intent to commit child molestation. On March 28, 2005, Judge Rodney Melville ruled that prosecutors could introduce evidence concerning alleged prior sexual offenses by Jackson, including the 1993 allegations, under a California law permitting such evidence in sexual-abuse cases. In 2004, Santa Barbara prosecutors had consulted the FBI concerning the 1993 accuser Jordan Chandler, and the FBI opened a related federal travelers/enticement investigation. Two FBI agents interviewed the redacted accuser in New York in September 2004; according to the FBI memorandum, he said that he had no interest in testifying against Jackson and would legally oppose any attempt to make him do so, saying that he "believed that he had done his part". Contemporary reporting identified the interviewee as Jackson's 1993 accuser. The federal investigation was closed in December 2004 with no outstanding leads or evidence items. Raymond Chandler, Jordan's uncle, separately told NBC's Today that his nephew had left the country to avoid testifying because he did not want his life further exposed publicly. The People v. Jackson trial began in Santa Maria, California, on January 31, 2005.

Jordan Chandler did not testify. His mother June Chandler testified about her son's relationship with Jackson in 1993, instead. She told jurors that during a trip to Las Vegas Jackson became upset when she initially refused to allow Jordan to sleep in his bedroom, repeatedly questioned why she did not trust him, and was “sobbing” and “shaking”; she said that she eventually relented and that Jackson gave her a Cartier gold bracelet the following day. She also testified that Jackson later stayed at the Chandler home more than 30 times and slept in Jordan's bedroom. On cross-examination, she said that she had not spoken to her son in 11 years. She did not testify that she had personally witnessed Jackson molesting Jordan. Melville later declined to admit proposed prosecution evidence concerning the 1993 accuser's description of markings on Jackson's genitals, citing in part the accuser's absence and resulting inability of the defense to cross-examine him. On June 13, 2005, the jury acquitted Jackson on all ten counts in the indictment.

== Timeline of allegations ==
=== 1993 ===
- July 7, 1993 – Evan Chandler's attorney, Barry Rothman, files a proposed custody agreement restricting Jordan Chandler's contact with Michael Jackson and requesting a psychiatric evaluation.
- July 1993 (July 8, according to Taraborrelli) – David Schwartz records telephone conversations in which Evan Chandler threatens to damage Jackson's career. Jackson's representatives later cite the recordings as evidence of attempted extortion, which Chandler denies.
- July 1993 (exact date uncertain) – Jackson's private investigator, Anthony Pellicano, questions Jordan about his relationship with Jackson. According to a police report, Jordan provides no information.
- July 12, 1993 – June Chandler signs an agreement granting Evan legal custody of Jordan and restricting his contact with Jackson. She later challenges it, alleging that Evan pressured her into signing.
- July 14, 1993 – Evan Chandler and Rothman consult psychiatrist Mathis Abrams about suspected abuse.
- July 16, 1993 – According to Evan Chandler, Jordan discloses alleged sexual contact with Jackson after undergoing a dental procedure.
- August 4, 1993 – Evan and Jordan Chandler meet Jackson and Anthony Pellicano at the Westwood Marquis Hotel. Evan confronts Jackson with abuse allegations and subsequently proposes a $20 million settlement. Pellicano alleges attempted extortion, which Chandler disputes.
- August 13, 1993 – Pellicano proposes a $350,000 screenwriting arrangement, which Chandler rejects, ending the negotiations.
- August 16–17, 1993 – Following June Chandler's challenge, Judge Kenneth A. Black voids the earlier custody agreement and orders Jordan returned to his mother.
- August 17, 1993 – Jordan reports alleged sexual abuse to psychiatrist Mathis Abrams, who notifies child protective services, prompting an investigation by the Los Angeles Police Department (LAPD).
- August 21, 1993 – Investigators search Neverland Ranch and Jackson's Century City condominium, seizing videotapes and other materials.
- August 23–24, 1993 – The investigation becomes public. Jackson's representatives deny the allegations and accuse Evan Chandler of attempted extortion, citing an alleged $20 million demand.
- August 26–27, 1993 – Investigators question other boys associated with Jackson. A police source reports that seized videotapes yielded no incriminating evidence and that sufficient physical or medical evidence had not been found.
- August 29, 1993 – Investigators search Jackson's former suite at the Mirage Hotel in Las Vegas, reportedly seizing no evidence.
- August 30, 1993 – Jackson's representatives release excerpts of Schwartz's recordings to support their extortion allegations. The Los Angeles Times reports that the recordings appeared edited and did not establish Chandler's precise demands.
- August 30, 1993 – Attorney Gloria Allred begins representing Jordan Chandler.
- September 2, 1993 – Gloria Allred announces that Jordan wants the allegations examined in court and that a civil lawsuit is being considered.
- September 10–13, 1993 – Allred withdraws from the case, and attorney Larry R. Feldman replaces her as Jordan's civil attorney.
- September 14, 1993 – Jordan Chandler files a civil lawsuit against Jackson, alleging sexual battery, negligence and fraud. Jackson denies the allegations.
- September 22, 1993 – Investigators interview former Neverland employees Mark and Faye Quindoy in Manila about alleged inappropriate conduct involving Jackson and boys.
- October 6, 1993 – Psychiatrist Richard A. Gardner evaluates Jordan in New York, conducting a videotaped interview in which Jordan alleges sexual abuse.
- October 28, 1993 – Jackson's attorney Bertram Fields accuses LAPD investigators of pressuring children. Police Commission President Gary Greenebaum rejects the allegations.
- October 29, 1993 – Jackson's attorneys deny the civil allegations, allege attempted extortion and request a stay of proceedings to protect his Fifth Amendment rights during the criminal investigation.
- November 8, 1993 – LAPD investigators search the Jackson family's Hayvenhurst residence, seizing photographs and other materials.
- November 12, 1993 – Jackson cancels the remainder of his Dangerous World Tour, citing prescription painkiller dependency and stress related to the allegations.
- November 15, 1993 – Jackson's attorneys Bertram Fields and Howard Weitzman confirm that he is receiving treatment abroad and is temporarily unable to participate fully in legal proceedings.
- November 19, 1993 – Investigators seize medical records from two physicians while examining possible changes to Jackson's physical appearance.
- November 22, 1993 – Five former security guards sue Jackson, alleging dismissal over information about his relationships with boys. Jackson's attorney denies the allegations.
- November 23, 1993 – Judge David Rothman rejects Jackson's request to delay the civil lawsuit and schedules trial for March 21, 1994, despite his attorneys' Fifth Amendment concerns.
- November 23, 1993 – Jackson's attorneys report subpoenas for a possible Santa Barbara County grand jury investigation, without confirmation that a grand jury has convened.
- December 2, 1993 – Jackson's chauffeur, Gary Hearne, testifies that he collected luggage from Jackson's condominium on the day of an August police search and delivered it to Pellicano.
- December 8, 1993 – La Toya Jackson publicly alleges that Jackson abused children and paid families for their silence. Jackson's family and attorneys reject her claims.
- December 10, 1993 – Jackson returns to California after receiving treatment abroad. Attorney Johnnie Cochran confirms his return on December 13.
- December 13, 1993 – Former housekeeper Blanca Francia tells the Los Angeles Times that she allegedly witnessed Jackson naked with boys and has spoken with investigators.
- December 17, 1993 – Judge Rothman allows prosecutors access to civil depositions and rejects broad restrictions on attorneys' public statements.
- December 20, 1993 – Investigators photograph Jackson's body, including his genitalia, during a court-authorized examination to compare his physical characteristics with Jordan Chandler's description.
- December 21, 1993 – Bertram Fields and Anthony Pellicano confirm their departure from Jackson's defense team. Howard Weitzman and Johnnie Cochran remain his attorneys.
- December 22, 1993 – Jackson publicly denies the allegations in a televised statement, describing the physical examination as humiliating.

=== 1994 ===
- January 4, 1994 – Jordan Chandler's attorney Larry R. Feldman seeks access to photographs from Jackson's physical examination, alternatively requesting another examination or their exclusion from trial.
- January 24, 1994 – Los Angeles prosecutors decline to charge Evan Chandler with attempted extortion, citing insufficient evidence. Anthony Pellicano disputes the decision.
- January 25, 1994 – Jackson settles Jordan Chandler's civil lawsuit out of court without admitting wrongdoing. Financial terms remain undisclosed, and the criminal investigation continues.
- February 7, 1994 – A Santa Barbara County grand jury begins hearing evidence concerning the allegations against Jackson.
- March 1994 – A Los Angeles County grand jury hears evidence. Jackson's mother, Katherine, is subpoenaed amid questions about possible changes to his physical appearance.
- April 30, 1994 – The Santa Barbara County grand jury reportedly concludes its hearings without returning an indictment. The investigation continues.
- June 30, 1994 – The Los Angeles County grand jury's term ends without an indictment. The investigation remains open.
- July 6, 1994 – Jordan Chandler informs prosecutors that he will not testify in a criminal trial. His attorney cites death threats, media attention and the investigation's impact on Jordan.
- August 16, 1994 – Jordan's stepfather, David Schwartz, sues Jackson, alleging that his involvement with the Chandler family contributed to the breakdown of Schwartz's marriage. Jackson's attorney disputes the claim.
- September 15, 1994 – A judge rules that Jackson may invoke his Fifth Amendment rights in a separate lawsuit brought by five former security guards.
- September 21, 1994 – Prosecutors Gil Garcetti and Tom Sneddon announce that no criminal charges will be filed, citing Jordan's refusal to testify and two other potential complainants' unwillingness to participate. They state that Jackson has not been exonerated and that the case could be reopened.

=== 1995 ===
- January 9, 1995 – Journalist Diane Dimond reports that investigators are seeking a videotape allegedly depicting Jackson sexually abusing a minor. Jackson denies its existence, and prosecutors are unable to verify the report.
- January 12, 1995 – Jackson files a defamation lawsuit against Dimond, Paramount Pictures, KABC radio and others over the reports. Hard Copy stands by its reporting.
- June 14, 1995 – Jackson and Lisa Marie Presley appear on ABC's PrimeTime Live, where Jackson denies the allegations, discusses the civil settlement and acknowledges sharing a bed with children while denying sexual conduct.
