= Trial of Michael Jackson =

2005 child abuse trial of American singer

People v. Jackson
- Court: Santa Barbara County Superior Court
- Full case name: The People of the State of California v. Michael Joseph Jackson
- Decided: June 13, 2005
- Verdict: Michael Jackson found not guilty on all 10 counts
- Charge: Conspiracy; Lewd act upon a minor child (4 counts); Attempting to commit a lewd act upon a minor child; Administering an intoxicating agent to assist in the commission of a felony (4 counts); Providing alcoholic beverages to persons under the age of 21 (lesser included offense; 4 counts)

Court membership
- Judge sitting: Rodney Melville

People v. Jackson (full title: 1133603: The People of the State of California v. Michael Joseph Jackson) was a 2005 criminal trial held in Santa Barbara County Superior Court in Santa Maria, California. The American pop singer Michael Jackson was charged with molesting Gavin Arvizo, who was 13 years old at the time of the alleged abuse, at his Neverland Ranch estate in Los Olivos, California.

Jackson was first accused of child sexual abuse in 1993; he denied the allegations and settled in a civil lawsuit. In 2003, the documentary Living with Michael Jackson showed Jackson holding hands with Arvizo and defending his practice of sharing his bed with children, triggering an investigation. Jackson was indicted on four counts of molesting a minor, four counts of intoxicating a minor to molest him, one count of attempted child molestation, one count of conspiring to hold the Arvizo family captive and conspiring to commit extortion and child abduction.

The jury selection began on January 31, 2005. Gavin and his brother testified that Jackson had given them alcohol, showed them pornography, masturbated before them, and made sexual advances. The defense characterized the witnesses for the prosecution as disgruntled ex-employees or individuals seeking to exploit Jackson for money. Witnesses for the defense included testimony from celebrities including the former child actor Macaulay Culkin and the comedian Chris Tucker. Coverage of the trial was described as a media circus, with most media outlets quick to portray Jackson as guilty.

Jackson was acquitted on all counts on June 13, 2005. He never returned to Neverland Ranch and spent several months living in Bahrain and Ireland. In 2013, four years after Jackson's death, one of the defense witnesses, Wade Robson, changed his position and filed a lawsuit, saying he had been abused by Jackson.

== Background ==
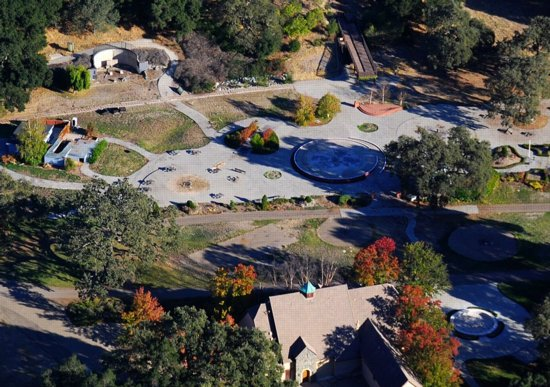
Jackson's Neverland Ranch in 2008, the site of the alleged sexual abuse

In 1993, Jackson was accused of child sexual abuse by 13-year-old boy Jordan Chandler. The abuse allegedly took place at Jackson's Neverland Ranch home in Santa Barbara, California. In January 1994, Jackson settled the lawsuit made against him for $23 million (equivalent to $51.68 million in 2026 adjusted for inflation) with $5 million (equal to $11.24 million in 2026) going to the family's lawyers. The settlement was not an admission of guilt; Jackson said he had settled to prevent the lawsuit interfering with his career and said he later regretted it. Prosecutors pursued the criminal case and presented the evidence to two separate grand juries, neither of which indicted.

In 2000, Gavin Arvizo, a child cancer patient, was introduced to Jackson by businessman and comedian Jamie Masada. Gavin's father, David Arvizo, who was separated from Arvizo's mother, often asked celebrities for money to support his son's cancer treatments. Gavin was receiving chemotherapy and required the removal of his spleen and left kidney. Jackson and Gavin became friends, and Jackson invited Gavin and his family to Neverland Ranch. Gavin thanked Jackson for "helping [him] be happy and beat cancer". According to Gavin, after a few visits to Neverland, Jackson suddenly stopped calling him; Gavin said he felt abandoned.

In 2002, Jackson invited Gavin, then 12 years old, to be a part of an ITV documentary, Living with Michael Jackson. Presenter Martin Bashir interviewed Jackson over eight months for the film. Jackson and Gavin were seen holding hands. Bashir asked Jackson about the appropriateness of a grown man having sleepovers and sharing a bed with a young person. Jackson said he allowed guests to sleep in his bed alone while he slept on the floor, and that it was not sexual. He said it was a "beautiful thing", and that he had shared his bed with many children, including actors Macaulay Culkin and Kieran Culkin.

The documentary drew controversy and calls for Jackson's children to be removed from his custody. Jackson called the documentary deceptive and a "gross distortion of the truth". Gavin's mother, Janet Arvizo, said it misrepresented her son's relationship with Jackson; she instructed Theodore Goddard, the London law firm, to file complaints against the Independent Television Commission, which oversees ITV. Bashir defended his interview, saying: "Here's an individual who is 44 years old, sleeping in the bed of children who have no biological relationship with him. I did not set out to ensnare him with a child."

Jackson's production team recorded a two-hour rebuttal film, The Michael Jackson Interview: The Footage You Were Never Meant to See, which was screened by Fox Broadcasting Company. Jackson decided to release the film after feeling betrayed by Bashir. Macaulay Culkin appeared on Larry King Live to defend Jackson, saying nothing inappropriate had occurred at Neverland Ranch. He said: "Michael Jackson's bedroom is two stories and has three bathrooms. When I slept in his bedroom, you have to understand the whole scenario. The thing is that, with Michael, he isn't very good at explaining himself."

Gloria Gruber, president of Prevent Child Abuse California, called for authorities to interview the children with whom he had shared his bed, saying: "The fact that he sleeps with children who are unrelated to him is definitely a red flag and concern." Santa Barbara district attorney Tom Sneddon, who had attempted to bring Jackson to trial over the 1993 allegations, initially said that, under Californian law, sleeping with a child without "affirmative, offensive conduct" was not illegal, and "sleeping in bed with a kid is not a crime that I know of".

== Investigation and arrest ==
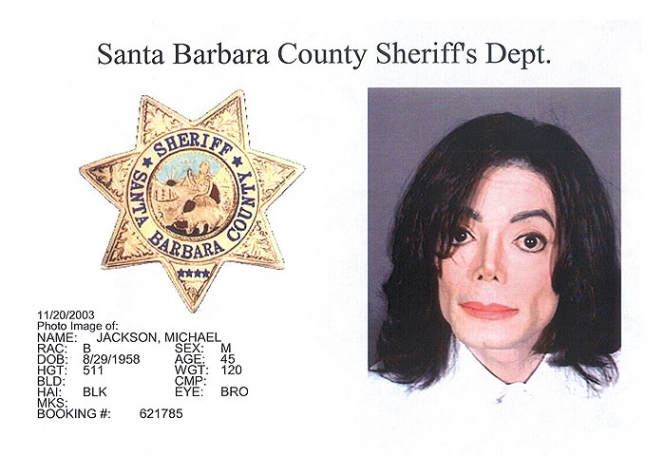
Michael Jackson's mug shot in 2003

From February 14 to February 27, 2003, a few weeks after the broadcast of the documentary, the Los Angeles Department of Child and Family Services conducted a preliminary investigation of Jackson and Gavin. In a confidential report based on interviews with the Arvizos, which leaked to the media, child welfare officials stated that they believed that accusations of illicit conduct were unfounded.

In June 2003, Santa Barbara district attorney Tom Sneddon reopened the investigation. In July and August, he interviewed Gavin along with his father David, mother Janet, and younger brother Star. In November, Gavin told the police that Jackson had molested him several times between February 7 and March 10, 2003, when, according to Janet, Jackson had held the family captive at Neverland. This timeline was revised in the grand jury indictment, which stated that the alleged acts of molestation occurred between February 21 and March 12, 2003.

On November 18, 2003, deputies from the Santa Barbara County Sheriff's Office searched Neverland Ranch with a search warrant but did not find Jackson. Investigators later found out that Jackson and his three children were in Las Vegas, where Jackson was shooting a music video for his single "One More Chance". Jackson was arrested two days later on November 20. He was released an hour later after posting a $3 million bond.

Shortly after the arrest, Jackson issued a statement saying the claims were "predicated on a big lie". In an interview with the news program 60 Minutes, Jackson said the police had mistreated him and complained of a dislocated shoulder. He reaffirmed his innocence and said that he was determined not to settle out of court as he had done in 1993. In August 2004, the California attorney general's office concluded, after an independent investigation, that Jackson was neither "manhandled" nor mistreated when he was taken into custody.

On December 18, 2003, Jackson was charged with seven counts of child molestation and two counts of administering an intoxicating agent for the purpose of committing a felony. On January 16, 2004, the day of his arraignment, Jackson climbed on top of his car to dance and wave to fans. On April 21, a grand jury indicted Jackson on several additional related charges, including conspiracy involving child abduction, false imprisonment, and extortion. Jackson pleaded not guilty on April 30. He faced a sentence of up to 18 years in prison if convicted at trial.

== Trial ==
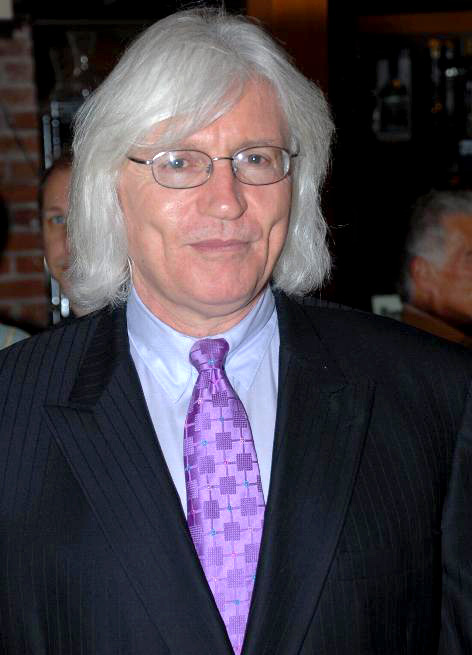
Thomas Mesereau (pictured in 2007) led the defense.

The trial began on February 28, 2005, in the courthouse of Santa Maria, Santa Barbara. Santa Barbara County Judge Rodney Melville presided over the trial. Melville, who had a contentious relationship with the news media, banned cameras from the courtroom and put a gag order on both sides. He delayed the three-day jury selection process for a week while Jackson was hospitalized, reportedly with flu.

Sneddon led the prosecution. Jackson's legal team attempted to have him and his staff disqualified from the trial, citing bias following his attempts to prosecute Jackson in 1993; Melville dismissed the attempts. The defense was led by celebrity lawyer Thomas Mesereau, recommended to the Jackson family by fellow legal defense attorney Johnnie Cochran who ten years prior had gained notoriety for defending former Hall of Fame football player O. J. Simpson during his highly publicized murder trial.

Melville allowed prosecutors to introduce testimony about past allegations against Jackson, including the 1993 case, to establish whether Jackson had a propensity to commit such crimes. The prosecution hoped to show that Jackson had engaged in a pattern of sexual abuse with boys. They called on witnesses to describe earlier incidents, including Jackson's alleged 1993 abuse of Jordan Chandler. The prosecution argued that Jackson used Neverland, his "fantasy hideaway" with candy and theme park attractions, to lure boys and groom them into sex, and flattered their parents with gifts. The prosecution also said that, after Living with Michael Jackson aired, Jackson and his entourage had attempted to hold the Arvizo family virtually captive at Neverland and force them to participate in a rebuttal film.

On March 10, as Gavin Arvizo was about to testify, Jackson was absent from court. Judge Melville issued a warrant for his arrest and said Jackson's $3 million bond would be forfeited if he did not arrive within an hour. Jackson arrived an hour and ten minutes late looking disheveled wearing his pyjamas and a blazer on top and appeared to weep in court. In an interview shortly afterwards, he said he had slipped in the shower and bruised his lung "very badly". He said the ongoing trial had been the lowest period in his life, and denied rumors about his financial problems, saying they were part of a smear campaign.

=== Witnesses for the prosecution ===
==== Martin Bashir ====
On March 1, British journalist Martin Bashir, who had interviewed Jackson for Living with Michael Jackson, took to the witness stand while prosecutors showed the documentary to jurors. Bashir refused to answer questions from defense attorneys.

==== Jason Francia ====
On April 4, Jason Francia, whose mother worked as a maid at Neverland Ranch, testified that Jackson had abused him on several occasions when he was seven to ten years old. Francia testified that Jackson reached into his shorts and touched his genitals for several minutes. Francia said that "every time I was being tickled there was some sort of exchange of money", done with the understanding that he would not tell his mother. His mother said she had reached an out-of-court settlement with Jackson, reportedly for $2 million. She sold her stories to the tabloid National Enquirer and the television show Hard Copy.

On cross-examination, Francia acknowledged that in his first 1993 interview he told detectives Jackson had not molested him. He said he had denied being improperly touched by Jackson because he did not want to be embarrassed at school. He said he went into counseling until he was eighteen. Mesereau sought to establish that the Francias were goaded into their accusations by overzealous prosecutors and tempted by money offered for media interviews. Jury foreman Paul Rodriguez compared Jason's to Janet Arvizo's erratic behavior on the stand. He said he did not seem credible and "left too many little loopholes in his statements".

==== Neverland Ranch staff ====
In April 2005, Ralph Chacon, a former security guard at Neverland Ranch, testified that he had seen Jackson performing oral sex on Chandler in the early 1990s. Chacon also described seeing Jackson passionately kiss Chandler and place his hand on Chandler's crotch. Chacon said that he did not report the incident to police because he thought he would not be believed. A former maid at the ranch, Adrian McManus, testified that she had seen Jackson kissing boys, including Macaulay Culkin, and described Jackson touching Culkin's leg and rear. She told the court that she had seen Jackson touching Chandler's genitals. Culkin, however, had always vehemently denied being sexually abused by Jackson.

Blanca Francia, a maid at the Neverland Ranch, claimed to have seen Michael Jackson and Wade Robson in the shower. Francia confirmed that she had been paid $20,000 for her interview with Hard Copy, which included a similar allegation.

The defense sought to portray Chacon and McManus as incredible witnesses. According to The Observer, each witness had a "horrific story ... Yet, rather than calling the police, each appears to have sold that story to a supermarket tabloid." McManus had previously denied witnessing misconduct from Jackson in a 1993 court deposition while under oath. In the 2005 trial, she said she had lied during the deposition because she feared that Jackson would report her to her superiors if she told police about the incident. In the 1990s, Chacon and McManus had been part of a lawsuit filed against Jackson for wrongful dismissal. After Jackson counter-sued, their lawsuit was thrown out as fraudulent and malicious. According to testimony, Chacon and McManus had been found guilty of stealing items from Jackson's house amounting to more than $50,000 and ordered to pay more than $1 million in legal fees. On cross-examination, the pair affirmed that they had been paid for media interviews. McManus also acknowledged that she and her husband were found to have previously defrauded a relative's children and had stolen a sketch by Jackson worth $35,000. Mesereau accused the pair of attempting to "get even" with Jackson for the failed suit and characterized them as money-seekers.

Housekeeper Kiki Fournier testified that the Arvizo children became unruly at Neverland Ranch without authority figures. She said that the Arvizo boys "trashed" their guest rooms, and that at one point Star had pointed a knife at her in Jackson's kitchen. She said that although the boys had guest rooms they would often stay with Jackson. However, she said she never saw Jackson giving the boys alcohol and never saw them drunk.

Cynthia Bell, a flight attendant who had served Jackson, testified that she never saw him share his drink with Gavin. She said she had devised the custom of serving Jackson wine in soda cans because Jackson did not like to openly drink alcohol in front of his children. Bell said she had not seen Jackson "cuddling" with Gavin during the flight, but testified that she had seen Jackson put his arm around him while he was listening to music. She said that Gavin was demanding, complained about the food, and was unruly during the flight.

Phillip LeMarque, Jackson's cook, said that he entered Jackson's room and saw Jackson with his hand in Culkin's underpants. LeMarque and his wife, also a Jackson employee, had considered selling the story to a tabloid, but had backed out as the intermediary was "sleazy". LeMarque said he had decided not to sell because it was "against our principles".

Jesús Salas, a former house manager at Neverland Ranch, testified that he often saw Jackson drunk or affected by prescription drugs, and once saw three teenage boys emerging drunk from the wine cellar after having spent time with Jackson. When the prosecution attempted to confirm Jackson had served wine to minors, Salas said that although he brought a bottle of wine to Jackson's bedroom, sodas were also ordered for the children. The judge ruled out testimony from a former security guard who alleged that he saw Jackson in his bedroom with a boy.

==== Jordan Chandler ====
Jordan Chandler, the alleged victim in the 1993 child abuse allegations, left the country rather than appear as a witness. He had been legally emancipated from his parents.

Chandler's mother, June Chandler, testified that Jordan complained that she would not allow him to spend time in Jackson's bedroom. This appeared to upset Jackson, who had formed a bond with June and her children. June said Jackson asked her: "You don't trust me? We're a family. Why are you doing this?" She responded that Jordan should be allowed to sleep where he wanted, indicating a change of mind. Chandler testified that she had never suspected anything inappropriate between Jackson and Jordan. She told the court that she had not spoken to Jordan in eleven years.

==== Debbie Rowe ====
On April 28, Jackson's ex-wife Debbie Rowe was called to the witness stand. The prosecution claimed that Rowe was forced into a scripted videotaped statement made in early 2003 in support of Jackson. They hoped Rowe's testimony would support Janet Arvizo's claim that they were held captive and forced to make supportive statements about Jackson. Instead, Rowe was supportive of Jackson and said his business associates Marc Schaffel, Dieter Wiesner, and Ronald Konitzer were "opportunistic vultures" who wanted to exploit him. The prosecution moved to have Rowe dismissed, saying she was not providing the expected testimony, but her testimony was allowed by the judge.

==== Gavin Arvizo ====
Gavin Arvizo was 15 years old when he testified. He told the court that, after Living with Michael Jackson aired, Jackson had begun serving him and his younger brother wine, sometimes concealed in soda cans, showing them pornography and making sexual advances. He said that Jackson had twice manually stimulated him to ejaculation after they had drunk alcohol, and then told him that if men do not masturbate, they "might rape a girl". Challenged by Mesereau, who said that Gavin had told sheriffs that his grandmother had said this, Gavin said he was not sure what his grandmother had told him. Gavin also testified he had told his school administrator that Jackson had not molested him.

==== Star Arvizo ====
Gavin's younger brother, Star, told the court that he had twice seen Jackson molest Gavin. He also said that Jackson had displayed his erection and masturbated in front of them, telling them that "everyone did it", and encouraged them to try it. Star testified that Jackson had given the boys alcohol, sometimes in soda cans, which Jackson called "Jesus juice". Star also said Jackson had shown the brothers internet pornography on his computer.

On cross-examination, Mesereau questioned Star about a 1998 case in which his family sued J. C. Penney. The family alleged that Star, his brother, and their mother were beaten in a parking lot by security guards after leaving with clothes they had not paid for. Janet Arvizo also claimed to have been sexually assaulted and falsely imprisoned. The family received a settlement of $152,000 (equivalent to $300,000 in 2025). In a 2000 sworn statement for the case, Star had said his "mother and father never [fought]." Janet and her children claimed that David Arvizo physically abused them for 17 years. Star admitted he lied in the statement. The admission was a major victory to the defense. Also, it was stated that the Arvizos had not visited Neverland since March 2003. However, when shown a pornographic magazine dated August 2003, five months after the family stopped visiting Neverland, Star claimed that was one of the magazines Jackson had shown them. Star would later attempt to recant this testimony too.

==== Janet Arvizo ====
The defense sought to portray Janet Arvizo as untrustworthy, with a history of perjury and fraud. She admitted to having lied under oath in court in an earlier lawsuit. The prosecution planned to have an expert on domestic violence testify that she may have lied because she had been beaten by her ex-husband, but the judge did not allow it, saying it would be irrelevant. The defense also presented evidence of Janet having committed welfare fraud, for which she was later convicted and fined $8,600 and given 150 hours of mandatory community service.

In regard to the J.C. Penney case, which eventually settled for $152,000, the defense brought in a welfare worker who stated that Janet had failed to disclose her receipt of the settlement that her family had received days before filling out a welfare application. A paralegal testified that Janet had lied under oath to win that lawsuit, claiming that bruises caused by her then-husband had been caused by J.C. Penney security guards.

Connie Keenan, editor of the Mid Valley News, said she was "duped" by Janet into writing a story about Gavin's sickness because the original story did not make enough money. Other witnesses for the defense showed Janet had spent $7,000 shopping and dining out at the same time she alleged Jackson kept her and her family captive. Janet's sister-in-law offered to help Arvizo's treatment by holding blood donation campaigns. She said Janet swore at her and rejected the offer.

=== Witnesses for the defense ===
According to Jackson's defense attorney Susan Yu, over 500 witnesses were prepared in the case.

==== Macaulay Culkin ====
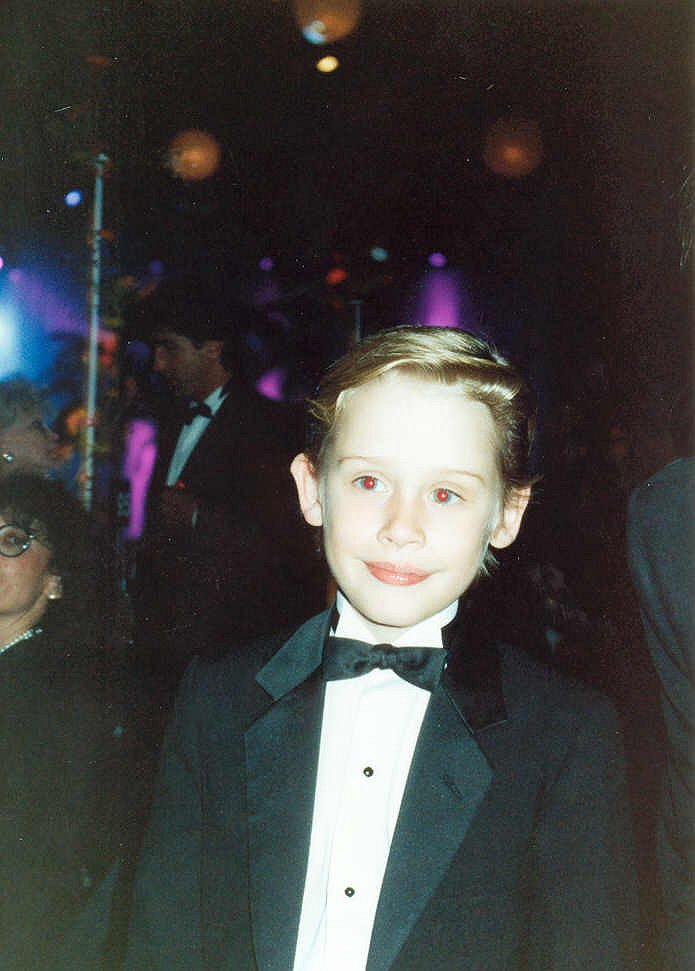
The former child star Macaulay Culkin (pictured in 1991) testified that he had shared a bed with Jackson but had never been molested.

The former child star Macaulay Culkin testified that he had shared a bed with Jackson on a dozen or more times between the ages of nine and 14, but had never been molested and had never seen Jackson act improperly, contrary to many of the prosecution's witness testimonies. He said that his parents had known he was in Jackson's bedroom and "never saw it as an issue". He described shock at hearing allegations that Jackson had molested him, and dismissed them as "absolutely ridiculous". Culkin said they had bonded over their shared experience of child stardom. Culkin has consistently defended Jackson since, and said in a 2020 interview with Esquire: "I never saw anything; he never did anything."

==== Wade Robson ====
Wade Robson testified as Jackson's first defense witness that he had slept in Jackson's bedroom several times but had never been molested. Robson recalled his first visit to Neverland Ranch in 1989 and had slept in Jackson's bedroom on all but three or four of his 20 or so visits. He said they played video games, watched movies, talked and sometimes had pillow fights.

==== Brett Barnes ====
Barnes first met Jackson at the age of five when Jackson went to Australia during one of his tours. He shared a bedroom with Jackson at least ten times but denied any impropriety. Barnes was aware of the prosecutor's witness testimonies claiming they had seen Jackson touch him inappropriately. In response, Barnes said, "I'm very mad about it. It's not true and they put my name through the dirt. I'm really not happy about it." In 2019, Barnes restated his denial of any molestation.

==== George Lopez ====
George Lopez testified that he had given the Arvizo family money when Gavin was fighting cancer, but came to believe that Gavin's father was more interested in money than helping his son. Lopez cut ties with the family after the father became more demanding. Lopez also said that the father had accused him of stealing $300 from Gavin's wallet. When the father asked what he was supposed to tell his son, Lopez testified that he responded: "Tell him his father's an extortionist."

==== Jay Leno ====
Jay Leno testified about his relationship with the Arvizo family. Leno made approximately 20 phone calls to sick children each week, and began receiving voicemail messages from Gavin, then a ten-year-old cancer patient, in 2000. Gavin called Leno "his hero", which Leno felt was unusual as "I'm not Batman... It sounded suspicious when a young person got overly effusive." Leno also said he heard another voice in the background of one call; the defense argued that this was Janet telling Gavin what to say.

==== Chris Tucker ====
Chris Tucker said he had felt sorry for the Arvizos, and he had given them money and gifts. He felt the Arvizos expected too much, calling him their "brother" and taking advantage of him. He testified that he had warned Jackson about the family, whom he called "cunning".

=== 1994 settlement ===
The judge allowed investigation evidence from Jackson's previous allegations to be used in the trial, but the 1994 settlement initiated by the Chandlers was deemed "irrelevant and inflammatory". The prosecution (Note: The document says plaintiff for the People of the State of California, but in criminal law, it should be prosecution.) attempted to subpoena evidence from the settlement as an indication of guilt. Mesereau argued that Jackson was not liable for any of the claims compromised by the arrangement, because Jackson's insurance company, Transamerica Insurance Group, was responsible for it. The insurance company negotiated the settlement over protests from Jackson and his legal counsel. The settlement included no admission of wrongdoing or guilt, otherwise, it would violate the California Insurance Code. The insurance company had "the right to settle claims covered by insurance where it decides settlement is expedient and the insured may not interfere with nor prevent such settlements," a practice established by several precedents in California. Evidence of insurance settlements would deprive Jackson of due process of law, proper cross-examination and violate Evidence Code 352 as he would not be able to verify the agreements made in the settlement. The settlement cannot be used as evidence of guilt in future civil and criminal cases.

== Verdict ==
The jury deliberated for about 32 hours over seven days. On the initial vote, nine jurors voted to acquit Jackson, while three voted guilty. On June 13, 2005, they returned a verdict of not guilty on all charges. Jurors found the prosecution's case weak and the timeline of accusations problematic because they had alleged the molestation occurred after the broadcast of the documentary, when media attention was on Jackson and Gavin. Jurors also described Janet's testimony as weak, and found it strange that she snapped her fingers and addressed them directly. The New York Times described her testimony as "rambling, incoherent, and at times combative". One juror believed that Janet was a scam artist.

Sneddon suggested that Jackson's celebrity status and the media had influenced the verdict. The jury foreman, a retired high school counselor, said, "We looked at all the evidence and we looked at Michael Jackson and one of the first things we decided was we had to look at him just as another person and not a celebrity."

== Media coverage ==
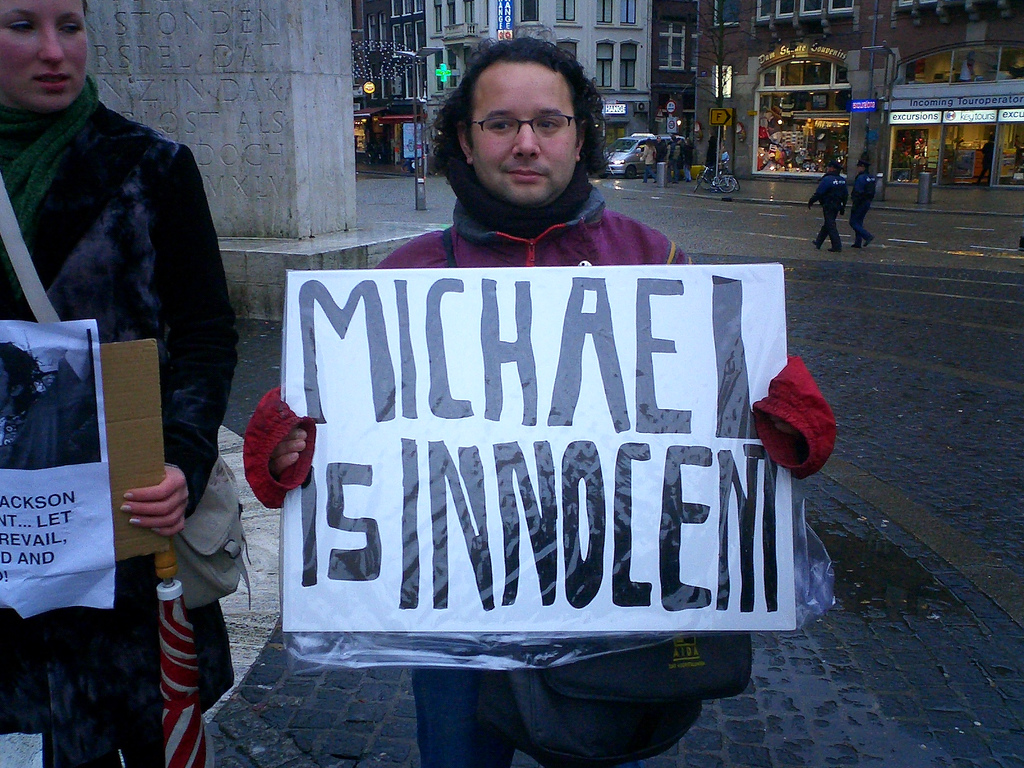
A Jackson supporter in Amsterdam, 2004

The trial attracted international media attention, and several commentators described it as a media circus and was one of many highly publicized trials that received the idiom the Trial of the Century. When news of the raid on Jackson's home broke, many channels switched to 24-hour rolling coverage; CBS, NBC, ABC, and VH1 produced television specials. The media covered Jackson's health, dress, and behavior, such as when he hopped on top of a car and waved to fans. The networks E! and Sky TV collaborated to produce re-enactments of highlights from the trial, which were broadcast daily. The re-enactment used look-alike actors, with impersonator Edward Moss portraying Jackson.

In 2010, British journalist Charles Thomson described the trial as "one of the most shameful episodes in journalistic history". He said the media coverage was "out of control ... The sheer amount of propaganda, bias, distortion, and misinformation is almost beyond comprehension." HuffPost contributor Luka Neskovic wrote that the trial "displayed [the] media at their worst", with "sensationalism, exclusivity, negativity, eccentrics, chaos, and hysteria". For example, according to Neskovic, when pornography was found in Jackson's home, many media outlets misreported it as child pornography. Neskovic observed that the media was more interested in reporting the prosecution than the defense, and that, for example, The Hollywood Reporter chose not to report two weeks of the defense case.

== Aftermath ==
Following the trial, Mesereau said Jackson would no longer allow people into his room and would no longer "easily allow people to enter his life", as he had become a target for "people who want to extract money or build careers". Jackson moved to the Persian Gulf island country of Bahrain as a guest of Abdullah bin Hamad bin Isa Al Khalifa. According to Jackson's brother Jermaine, unbeknownst to Jackson, the family had intended to send him to Bahrain with a private jet on standby at the nearest airport had he been convicted due to Bahrain not having an extradition treaty with the United States. Jackson then lived in Ireland and tried hard to stay out of the public eye. He never returned to Neverland Ranch, saying it had been despoiled by police searches. After the ranch was abandoned, the property faced severe financial difficulties due to the exorbitantly high operating costs and was facing foreclosure until an agreement was reached in 2008 to prevent a scheduled public auction.

The allegations continued to affect Jackson's career and permanently damaged his reputation. Despite achieving record breaking ticket sales for a long awaited series of comeback concerts in 2009, he was unable to find sponsors or merchandise partners. A judge observed in 2021 that "the fact that he earned not a penny from his image and likeness in 2006, 2007, or 2008 shows the effect those allegations had, and continued to have, until his death".

Four years after his acquittal, on June 25, 2009, Jackson died of acute propofol and benzodiazepine intoxication at his home in Holmby Hills, Los Angeles. After Jackson's death, Bashir told ABC News that he never saw any wrongdoing on Jackson's part, and said he felt Jackson's life had been "unorthodox" but not criminal. FBI files that were declassified and released to the public after Jackson's death noted that there were no outstanding leads or credible evidence items. In a 2017 episode of the true crime series The Jury Speaks, the four featured jurors of the trial said they would still vote to acquit Jackson.

=== Further allegations ===
In 2013, the Australian choreographer Wade Robson, who had testified in the trial that Jackson had not molested him, reversed his position. He said Jackson had molested him over seven years when he was a child. In 2014, another man who had spent time with Jackson as a child, James Safechuck, alleged that Jackson had also abused him. In March 2019, a documentary about their allegations, Leaving Neverland, aired, triggering further examination of Jackson's legacy.

== Bibliography ==
- Newberg, Debra. "Reflections and Corrections on Michael Jackson – America in the Mirror", 2010. 9780615320793, published by Newberg and Personal Promotions
