= Killing of Leonard Deadwyler =

African-American man killed by a police officer

- Leonard Deadwyler 7 days prior to his death
- Date: May 7, 1966; 60 years ago
- Location: 60th St. and Avalon Blvd., Los Angeles, California, U.S.
- Cause: Gunshot wound to the chest
- Participants: Jerold M. Bova and partner (LAPD officers)
- Outcome: Ruled accidental homicide
- Deaths: 1
- Coroner: Los Angeles County Coroner's Office

Leonard Deadwyler (February 19, 1941 – May 7, 1966) was an African-American man who was shot and killed by LAPD officer Jerold M. Bova after allegedly speeding and running red lights while driving his wife, who was in labor, to the hospital. His wife later sued Los Angeles for wrongful death, and was represented by Johnnie Cochran, but lost the case. However, his death helped spur the building of the Martin Luther King, Jr. Community Hospital in South Central.

== Life ==
Deadwyler was born on February 19, 1941, in Gainesville, Georgia. He was the oldest of three children. He met his wife Barbara (nee Buffington) in kindergarten, and they married in 1960. Shortly after, they moved to Kansas; Chattanooga, Tennessee; and finally, Los Angeles. The Deadwylers had three children together. At the time of his death, Barbara Deadwyler was pregnant with their youngest son, Michael.

== Shooting ==
Barbara Deadwyler was eight months pregnant and began experiencing what she believed to be labor pains. Deadwyler tied a white handkerchief to the car's antenna, to signify an emergency, a common sign in Georgia, where the couple had moved from a year earlier. While driving, Deadwyler ran through several red lights while speeding, causing a police chase that began at 108th Street and Avalon Boulevard, which he mistook as a police escort.

Bova eventually pulled the car over at 60th Street and Avalon, where he approached Deadwyler with his gun drawn and leaned into the car. Bova testified that the car lurched forward, causing his gun to go off and shoot Deadwyler at point-blank range. Deadwyler's wife stated that no such movement had taken place and that Bova "shot him for no reason."

== Investigation and inquest ==
During testimony, the State proffered that Deadwyler had a .35 blood-alcohol level and was drunk. His widow refuted this, as he had not been drinking, and an alcohol level that high would make it very difficult for an individual to function and drive safely at a high speed. Bova testified that the car had lurched forward, while the defense argued that it would be near impossible, as the car had been parked behind another vehicle.

On May 31, 1966, a coroner's jury ruled Deadwyler's death an accidental homicide, with one juror calling it an "excusable homicide." The jury, who deliberated for two hours and 35 minutes consisted of eight men and one woman. Only one member of the jury was Black.

At the time, it was the longest inquest over the death of a single individual in the Los Angeles County Coroner's office, lasting eight days with testimony from 49 witnesses and 87 exhibits. It was also the first televised inquest in California.

== See also ==
- List of unarmed African Americans killed by law enforcement officers in the United States
