= Diane Dimond =

American journalist

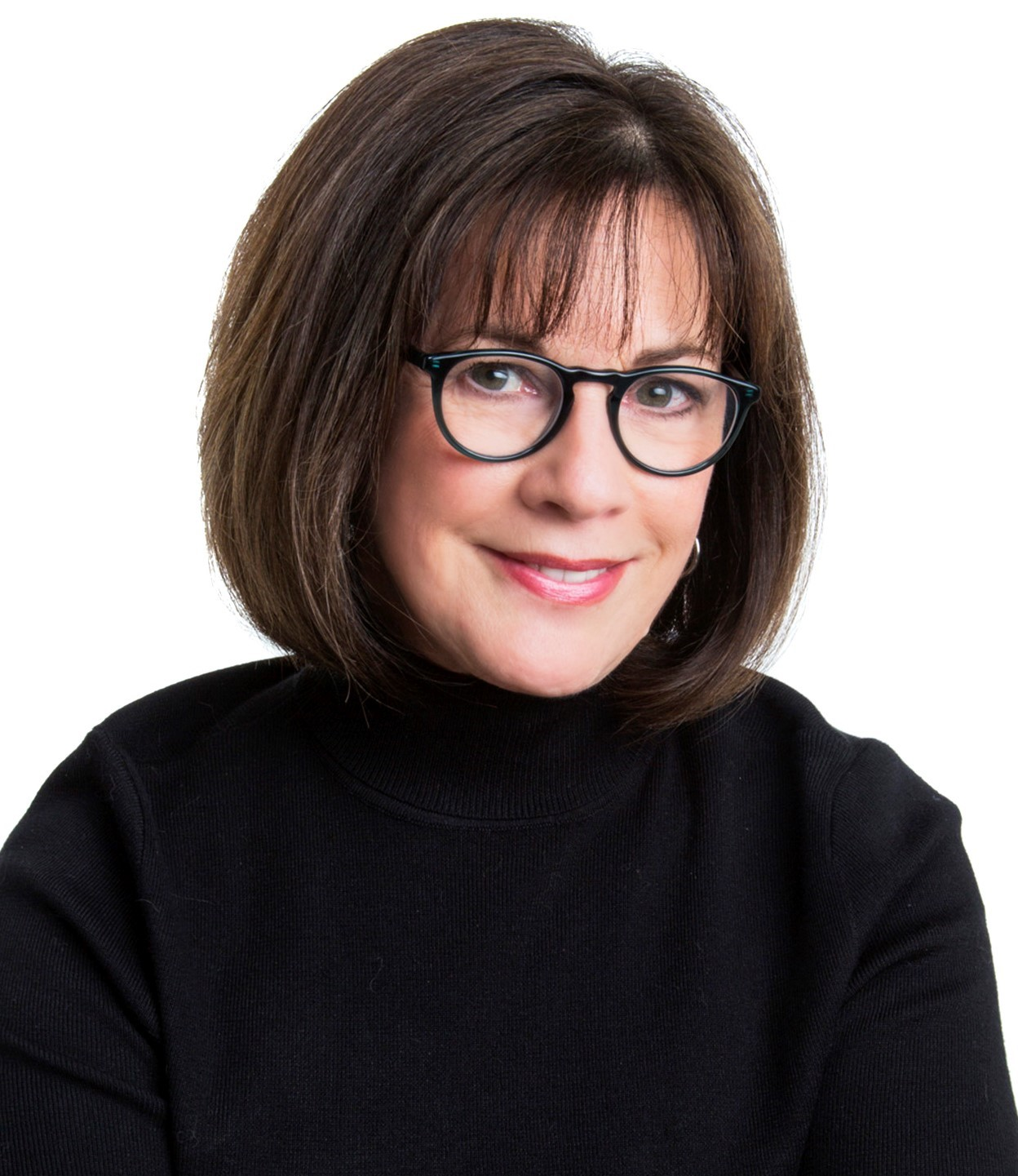
- Diane Dimond 2019
- Born: Diane Hughes; November 15, 1952 (age 74); Burbank, California, U.S.
- Education: Mark Twain Elementary School; Jefferson Middle School; Highland High School; University of New Mexico
- Occupations: Investigative journalist; author; syndicated columnist; TV commentator
- Spouses: Chuck Dimond (m. 1971; div. 1974) Michael Schoen (m. 1991)
- Children: 1
- Website: dianedimond.com

Diane Dimond (born November 15, 1952) is an American investigative journalist, author, syndicated columnist, and TV commentator.

She is best known for breaking the story of child molestation allegations against singer Michael Jackson and her coverage of the subsequent criminal trial. She has worked as a correspondent for Hard Copy, Extra, NBC, Entertainment Tonight, Court TV, and Investigation Discovery.

== Early life ==
Dimond was born in Burbank, California, the only child of Ruby and Allen Hughes. The family moved to Albuquerque, New Mexico where her parents owned and operated the Hughes Meat Co. While attending Highland High School, Dimond worked as a receptionist at KGGM, a CBS-affiliated television station in Albuquerque. It was there that she became interested in broadcast journalism.

== Career ==
=== Early career ===
Dimond began her career working at KOB Radio as a reporter where she covered legal and police matters. In 1976, she won a Silver Gavel Award from the American Bar Association for her investigative news reports about the misappropriation of funds by the Albuquerque Sheriff's Office.

In 1976, she moved to Washington, D.C, where she anchored newscasts for NPR's All Things Considered. From 1980 to 1986, Dimond was a congressional and political correspondent for the RKO Radio Networks.

In 1986, Dimond landed her first on-air television job at the flagship CBS station WCBS-TV in New York City. Over the next four years, she won several awards for high-profile scandals including an investigative series on chromium poisoning in New Jersey, a Long Island child molestation case, and the Mary Beth Whitehead/Baby M surrogacy case.

In 1990, Dimond became the investigative journalist for the tabloid television news show Hard Copy. During her seven-year tenure, she covered some of the most scandalous criminal cases in the country. In addition to covering the O. J. Simpson case, she conducted interviews with Heidi Fleiss, Hollywood Madame; Pamela Smart, who was convicted of convincing her high school student/lover to murder her husband, Kenneth Bianchi, the Hillside Strangler; James Earl Ray, Martin Luther King Jr.’s assassin; Jeffrey MacDonald, the Green Beret Killer; and Richard Allen Davis, murderer of Polly Klaas.

=== Michael Jackson case ===
In September 1993, while at Hard Copy, Dimond reported accusations of an inappropriate relationship between Michael Jackson and a young boy named Jordan Chandler. Jackson would eventually settle a lawsuit brought by the Chandler family, in an out of court settlement of more than $15 million. Though the family had the opportunity to proceed with the criminal investigation, criminal charges were never filed and Chandler would separate himself from his family.

Over the course of her investigation, Dimond interviewed freelance writer, Victor Gutierrez, who claimed that he had a video tape of Jackson molesting Jeremy Jackson, Michael Jackson’s nephew. Jackson subsequently filed a $100 million slander lawsuit against Dimond, Paramount Pictures Corp (producer of Hard Copy), and KABC-AM for including Gutierrez's claims. Jackson won the lawsuit.

=== NBC ===
In 1998, Dimond moved to NBC news, partnering with Geraldo Rivera on UpFront Tonight, a CNBC nightly newscast where she co-anchored the broadcast and covered some of the high-profile stories of the time, including former President Bill Clinton’s impeachment trial. She went on to cover the 2000 Presidential election and Florida recount for MSNBC as a daytime anchor. After leaving MSNBC in the summer of 2001, Dimond began her freelance career working as an anchor for Court TV and after the September 11, 2001 terror attacks, as an anchor for Fox News "War on Terror" coverage. Dimond also served as a guest on-air correspondent for a variety of other shows and stations, including CNN.

=== Michael Jackson criminal trial ===
In 2003, British journalist Martin Bashir released a documentary called Living with Michael Jackson which focused on the story of a young cancer victim, Gavin Arvizo and his family who had lived with Jackson since 2000. In the documentary, Jackson described having sleep-overs with Arvizo and other children. The documentary outraged viewers and launched a new investigation into allegations of child molestation. In the wake of a new round of accusations against Jackson, Dimond was promoted by Court TV to become their full-time Chief Investigative Reporter to cover the investigation and subsequent trial. It was during this time that Dimond began writing about her decade long involvement with investigating the case. Her book Be Careful Who You Love: Inside the Michael Jackson Case was released by Simon and Schuster/Atria in 2005.

During the Jackson trial, Dimond became the focus of intense criticism from Jackson’s fans who claimed that Dimond's coverage was biased and anti-Jackson. Despite getting a restraining order, harassment and stalking continued. After Jackson was acquitted in 2005 and her contract with Court TV ended, Dimond took a break from broadcasting, only appearing occasionally on TV as a special guest correspondent.

In 2013, Dimond attended Gavin Arvizo's (Jackson's accuser in the 2005 trial) wedding. Also present was retired prosecutor Ron Zonen, who represented the state in the 2005 trial.

=== Syndicated Columnist and Investigation Discovery TV ===
In 2007, Dimond began writing a weekly column for the Albuquerque Journal. In 2008, her column was syndicated by Creators Syndicate. and newspapers nationwide began publishing her take on crime and justice issues. Her work has been published by Newsweek, The Huffington Post, The Daily Beast, and Women in Crime Ink covering high-profile criminal cases, including the Casey Anthony murder trial and the child molestation case against Jerry Sandusky.

Between 2008 and 2010, Dimond appeared regularly on Disorder in the Court, a reality TV show where she provided narration to footage of shocking behavior inside real courtrooms and as a regular contributing correspondent for CBS's Entertainment Tonight. Also in 2010, she released her second book, Cirque Du Salahi: Be Careful Who You Trust, the story behind Tareq and Michaele Salahi, the so-called White House gate-crashers.

In 2015, Dimond made her directorial debut in Theater Trial, which followed the trial of Aurora Colorado Movie Theater mass killer, James Holmes.

Dimond's third book Thinking Outside the Crime and Justice Box, a compilation of some of her most compelling opinion and case commentary, was released in 2016. In that year, she also joined Investigation Discovery's An American Murder Mystery TV series as a legal commentator, covering the cases of JonBenet Ramsey, Pamela Smart, Casey Anthony, Chandra Levy, and Michael Peterson.

Currently, Dimond is working with Investigation Discovery's An ID Murder Mystery, to cover more headline grabbing cases including the disappearance of Madeleine McCann and real estate tycoon and accused murderer Robert Durst. She is also conducting research for her next book, The Final Racket: How the US Justice System Cheats the Elderly.

== Personal life ==
Dimond's first husband was news anchor Chuck Dimond with whom she has a daughter, Jenna. They divorced in 1974. Dimond married broadcast journalist, CBS Radio News anchor, and voice over artist Michael Schoen in January 1991.
