= Howard Weitzman =

American entertainment lawyer (1939–2021)

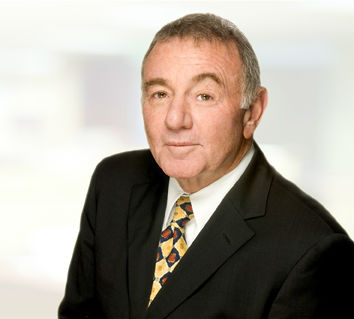
- Born: Howard Lloyd Weitzman; September 21, 1939; Los Angeles, California, U.S.
- Died: April 7, 2021 (aged 81); Los Angeles, California, U.S.
- Occupation: Entertainment lawyer
- Spouses: Stacey Furstman (m. 1969; div. 1976) Margaret Ginger Garabedian (m. 1981)
- Children: 2, including Armen

Howard Lloyd Weitzman (September 21, 1939 – April 7, 2021) was an American entertainment lawyer active in matters ranging from intellectual property and entertainment issues to family law and estate issues. He was notable for representing Michael Jackson's estate in the IRS case against it. His other famous clients included Justin Bieber, O. J. Simpson, and John DeLorean.

Weitzman was a founding partner at Kinsella Weitzman Iser Kump LLP (KWIKA), a boutique litigation firm in Santa Monica, California.

== Education ==
Weitzman completed his B.A. degree at the University of Southern California (1962) and his J.D. degree at the University of Southern California Gould School of Law (1965). He was admitted to the State Bar of California in 1966.

== Early career ==
Weitzman taught trial advocacy at the University of Southern California Gould School of Law for 12 years.

From 1995 to 1998, Weitzman served as Executive Vice President, Corporate Operations for Universal Studios, where he was responsible for corporate restructuring.

== Legal career ==
For a time, Weitzman was a Certified Specialist in Criminal Law (the State Bar of California Board of Legal Specialization). In 1986, he became a managing partner at the law firm of Wyman Bautzer, and then in 1991 joined the law firm of Katten Muchin Zavis & Weitzman. In 1994, after Nicole Brown Simpson and Ron Goldman were murdered, Nicole's ex-husband, O. J. Simpson, was one of Weitzman's clients and soon became the primary suspect. Though Weitzman initially offered his legal help, after enough evidence was produced to suggest Simpson was the killer and put him on trial, Weitzman dropped Simpson as a client, forcing him to hire Robert Shapiro and Johnnie Cochran instead.

Weitzman also appeared as a legal advisor in Murder One (1995), Murder in the First (2014), and Thank You for Smoking (2005).

Weitzman died in Los Angeles from cancer on April 7, 2021, at age 81.

== Awards and recognition ==
Weitzman twice won the Jerry Giesler Memorial Award as an outstanding trial lawyer in Los Angeles County.
