= Rodney Melville =

American judge (born 1941)

Rodney Scott Melville (born June 1941) is an American former judge. He was the presiding judge in Santa Barbara County's superior court. He was the judge in Michael Jackson's 2005 child molestion trial, in which Jackson was acquitted.

== Biography ==
Rodney Scott Melville was born in June, 1941 and studied at San Diego State University and Hastings College of the Law, University of California.

Melville became an attorney for the firm Melville & Iwasko and became a state certified specialist in family law. Melville served as a deputy district attorney in the San Bernardino County district attorney's office for two years.

In 1987, Melville was appointed to the municipal court bench. After three years he was promoted to the superior court.

Melville retired as a judge for the superior court in 2007, having served 17 years.

=== People v. Jackson ===
In 2005, Michael Jackson was accused of child molestation by a 13-year-old boy. The case went to court and Melville was appointed the presiding judge. Prior to the start of the trial, Melville had cameras banned from the courtroom, put a gag order on both sides and oversaw a three-day jury selection procedure.
