= Thomas W. Sneddon Jr. =

American lawyer and politician (1941–2014)

33rd District Attorney of Santa Barbara County
- In office January 3, 1983 – January 9, 2007
- Preceded by: Stan Roden
- Succeeded by: Christie Stanley

Personal details
- Born: Thomas William Sneddon Jr. May 26, 1941 South Gate, California, U.S.
- Died: November 1, 2014 (aged 73) Santa Barbara, California, U.S.
- Party: Republican
- Spouse: Pamela Shires (m. 1967)
- Children: 9
- Education: University of Notre Dame (BA); UCLA School of Law (JD)
- Known for: Prosecuting child sex abuse allegations against Michael Jackson

Thomas William Sneddon Jr. (May 26, 1941 – November 1, 2014) was an American lawyer and politician who served as the district attorney of Santa Barbara County, California, from 1983 to 2007. He is best known for leading two investigations of Michael Jackson on child sexual abuse allegations in 1993 and 2005. His most famous case was when he was prosecuting child molestation charges against Jackson in a 2005 trial, at the end of which Jackson was acquitted.

== Background ==
A native of Los Angeles County, Sneddon was born in South Gate, California, on May 26, 1941, and was raised in Lynwood, California. In 1963, he graduated from the University of Notre Dame, where he studied history and was on the boxing team, and in 1966 from UCLA Law School. From 1967 to 1969 he served in the U.S. Army during the Vietnam War.

== Career ==
From November 1969 until May 1977, Sneddon served as a Deputy District Attorney in Santa Barbara County. In 1977, he was promoted to the position of Supervisor of Criminal Operations. In 1982, he was elected the 33rd District Attorney of Santa Barbara County, succeeding Stan Roden and taking office on January 3, 1983. He was re-elected without opposition for five terms. He did not seek re-election in 2006 and retired in January 9, 2007; he was succeeded by Christie Stanley, a longtime deputy district attorney in his office.

A father of nine children, Sneddon was Chair of the Committee for Child Support Enforcement since its inception in 1991. He was presented with a "Director's Award" in 1995 by the California Family Support Council. A year later he was appointed co-chair of the National District Attorney's Child Support Committee and invited by the US Attorney General Janet Reno to be a member of the Presidential Commission's Federal Task Force to review and enhance federal criminal prosecutions for failure to pay child support.

Sneddon was a Republican, but in 2002, he endorsed the re-election of Democrat Bill Lockyer, who was seeking a second term as California's attorney general.

=== Prosecution of Michael Jackson ===
His most publicized cases were his two investigations of Michael Jackson on child sexual abuse allegations in 1993/1994 and from 2003 to 2005. Jackson settled a related civil suit with a civil settlement of over $15 million to the plaintiff Jordan Chandler who ceased cooperating with investigators soon after receiving the settlement from Jackson. The grand jury was disbanded before it could make a decision on indictment.

The second set of allegations against Jackson resulted in a trial which ended on June 13, 2005, with Jackson's acquittal. Sneddon later asserted that the jury was starstruck by Jackson, and maintained that any other defendant "would have been convicted in less than two hours".

In 1995 Jackson wrote a song about him, titled "D.S."; Sneddon denied ever listening to the song.

Jackson reportedly kept an "enemy list" on which Sneddon appeared, along with Rabbi Shmuley Boteach, illusionist Uri Geller, music executive Tommy Mottola, attorney Gloria Allred, and Janet Arvizo, mother of a Jackson accuser.

== Personal life ==
Sneddon and his wife, Pamela (née Shires), met at UCLA. They married in 1967 and had nine children.

On November 1, 2014, Sneddon died from cancer at Santa Barbara Cottage Hospital, at the age of 73.
