= Thomas Mesereau =

American attorney (born 1950)

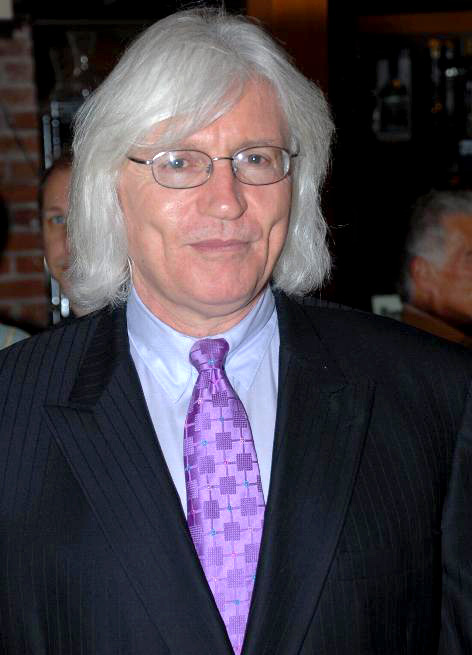
- Born: Thomas Arthur Mesereau Jr. July 1, 1950 (age 76); West Point, New York, U.S.
- Education: Harvard University (BA); London School of Economics (MSc); University of California, Hastings College of the Law (JD)
- Occupation: Lawyer
- Known for: Lead defense attorney in the 2005 Michael Jackson trial

Thomas Arthur Mesereau Jr. (born July 1, 1950) is an American attorney known for defending Michael Jackson in his 2005 child molestation trial, as well as Mike Tyson, Bill Cosby and Danny Masterson, a case in which Mesereau was sanctioned for sharing sensitive trial information, including the addresses of Masterson’s accusers, with Church of Scientology civil attorneys.

== Legal cases ==
=== Mike Tyson ===
Mesereau represented former world heavyweight boxing champion Mike Tyson in a rape investigation conducted by the San Bernardino County, California District Attorney's Office in 2001. Charges were dropped.

=== Robert Blake (actor) ===
Mesereau was the second lawyer during pre-trial proceedings in actor Robert Blake's case for the murder of his wife Bonnie Lee Bakley. Blake's first attorney Harland Braun resigned over Blake's decision to appear in a televised interview with Diane Sawyer against Braun's advice. For unprofessional conduct during the deposition, Mesereau was fined $18,950. After losing an appeal of the fine, he paid a total of $22,000. After Blake spent ten months in isolation in Los Angeles County Jail, Mesereau obtained bail for him. Mesereau cross-examined prosecution witnesses in a three-week, televised preliminary hearing. The hearing revealed flaws in the prosecution's case. Mesereau resigned from the case, declining to explain why.

=== Michael Jackson ===
In 2004, Mesereau and Susan Yu were hired to replace attorneys Mark Geragos and Ben Brafman as lead trial counsel. Johnnie Cochran, who represented Jackson during earlier molestation accusations, recommended Mesereau to Jackson's family. In an unusual pretrial hearing, Mesereau called Santa Barbara County District Attorney Thomas Sneddon to the witness stand and examined him under oath. The trial lasted from January to June 2005 and ended with Jackson acquitted of all 14 charges. Mesereau attended Jackson's funeral service and interment in 2009. In 2019, followed by the release of the documentary Leaving Neverland, Mesereau defended Jackson once again.

=== Joe Babajian ===
In 2009, Mesereau and Yu defended Joe Babajian in a high-profile mortgage fraud criminal trial in federal court in Los Angeles. Babajian had been indicted by a federal grand jury for twenty-one felony counts, including criminal conspiracy, real estate fraud, bank fraud, loan fraud, and wire fraud. Federal prosecutors claimed Babajian participated in a scheme to inflate property values and submit fraudulent loan documents and false property appraisals.

Eight individuals pleaded guilty to being part of the conspiracy prior to trial. Three individuals, including Babajian, went to trial. On August 10, 2009, the jury returned his verdict, acquitting Babajian of thirteen counts and being hung on the remaining eight counts. The other two defendants were convicted.

=== Claudia Haro ===
On April 9, 2012, Mesereau and Yu began jury selection in their defense of Claudia Haro, the ex-wife of Oscar-winning actor Joe Pesci. Haro was charged with conspiracy to murder and multiple counts of attempted murder. She was facing two consecutive life sentences.

The Los Angeles County District Attorney's Office claimed that Haro masterminded numerous attempts to murder her next husband, Garrett Warren, a stuntman who appeared in the movies Mission Impossible III, Avatar and Iron Man 2. The prosecution said Haro hired her brother, convicted drug dealer Manny Haro, and three others to murder Warren. During his divorce with Claudia Haro, Warren opened his front door and was shot four times, losing one eye.

The gunman, Jorge Hernandez, received life in prison in a separate trial. Haro's brother, the self-admitted middleman, also received life in prison. He agreed to testify against his sister. After the start of jury selection, Haro pleaded "no contest" to two counts of attempted murder with a sentence of twelve years, four months.

=== Suge Knight ===
On May 30, 2015, Mesereau was retained by rap mogul Marion "Suge" Knight, founder of Death Row Records. His appearance prompted the judge to reschedule a hearing on a motion by Knight to dismiss murder, attempted murder and hit-and-run charges. On January 22, 2016, however, lawyer Stephen L. Schwartz replaced Mesereau as Knight's defense lawyer. Schwartz and colleague Thaddeus Culpepper were later replaced by criminal defense attorneys Antoine D. Williams, Jamal Tooson, and Jeremy Lessem on May 9, 2016, as well.

=== Bill Cosby ===
On August 22, 2017, comedian Bill Cosby's sexual assault retrial was postponed after it was announced that Cosby had hired Mesereau to represent him at his retrial. On April 26, 2018, a jury found Cosby guilty of felony sexual assault on all three counts. Each of the three counts carries a prison term of up to 10 years. On June 15, 2018, Cosby fired Mesereau, replacing him with attorney Joseph P. Green Jr. On June 30, 2021, the Pennsylvania Supreme Court overturned Cosby's convictions.

== Pro bono work and awards ==
Although known for his celebrity cases, Mesereau is also an advocate for pro bono volunteer legal services. He has established a legal clinic in Los Angeles and accepts one capital murder case each year on behalf of a defendant in the Deep South who cannot afford representation.

In 2005, Barbara Walters named him one of the year's "Ten Most Fascinating People". GQ Magazine named him one of its "Men of the Year" in their December 2005 issue.

He has been named "Criminal Defense Lawyer of the Year" by the Criminal Courts Bar Association, Los Angeles and the Century City Bar Association, Los Angeles and has been listed as one of the "One Hundred Most Influential Attorneys in California" by the Los Angeles Daily Journal. Mesereau has also received the "Humanitarian Award" from the National Association of Blacks in Criminal Justice. Mesereau received a "Community Service Award" from Los Angeles Mayor Antonio Villaraigosa.

== Personal life and education ==
Mesereau was educated at Phillips Academy, Harvard University (cum laude), the London School of Economics and the University of California, Hastings College of the Law.

== Bibliography ==
- Sullivan, Randall; (2012). Untouchable: The Strange Life and Tragic Death of Michael Jackson. Grove Press. ISBN 978-0-8021-1962-9.
