= Johnnie Cochran =

American attorney (1937–2005)

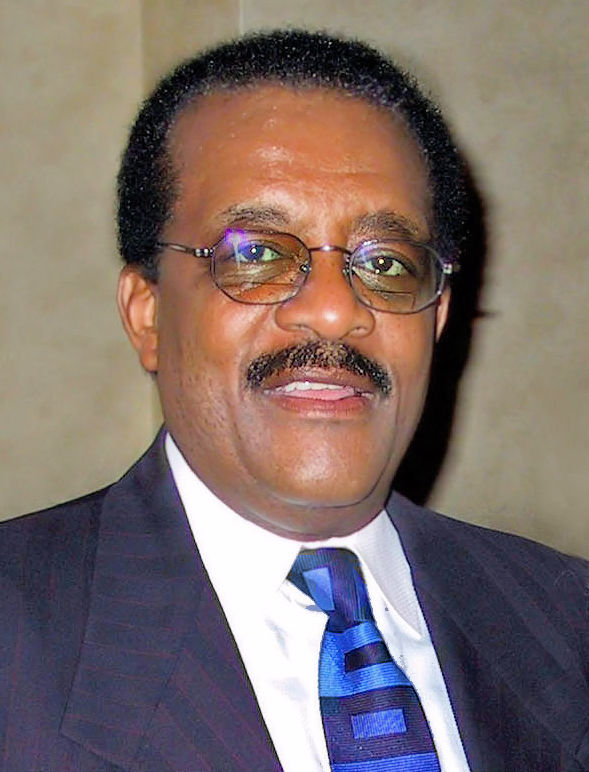
- Cochran in 2001
- Born: Johnnie Lee Cochran Jr. October 2, 1937; Shreveport, Louisiana, U.S.
- Died: March 29, 2005 (aged 67); Los Angeles, California, U.S.
- Education: University of California, Los Angeles (BA); Loyola Marymount University (JD)
- Known for: O. J. Simpson murder case
- Movement: Civil rights
- Spouses: Barbara Berry (m. 1960–1977); Sylvia Dale (m. 1985–2005)
- Children: 3
- Website: cochranfirm.com

Johnnie Lee Cochran Jr. (/ˈkɒkrən/ KOK-rən; October 2, 1937 – March 29, 2005) was an American attorney from California who was involved in numerous civil rights and police brutality cases throughout his 38-year career. He led the so-called "Dream Team" of defense lawyers during the murder trial of O. J. Simpson.

Cochran also represented Sean Combs, Michael Jackson, Tupac Shakur, Stanley Tookie Williams, Todd Bridges, football player Jim Brown, Snoop Dogg, former heavyweight champion Riddick Bowe, 1992 Los Angeles riot beating victim Reginald Oliver Denny, inmate and activist Geronimo Pratt, and athlete Marion Jones when she faced doping charges during her high school track career.

== Early life ==
Cochran was born in 1937 in Shreveport, Louisiana, the great-grandson of a slave. His father, Johnnie Cochran Sr. (October 20, 1916 – April 29, 2018), was an insurance salesman and his mother sold Avon products.

The family relocated to the West Coast during the second wave of the Great Migration, eventually settling in Los Angeles. Cochran was six years old when his family moved into a three bedroom, one bath, wood frame house in West Adams, which was a middle-class neighborhood at that time.

Cochran went to local schools and graduated first in his class from Los Angeles High School in 1955. He earned a Bachelor of Arts degree in business economics from the University of California, Los Angeles, in 1959 and a Juris Doctor from the Loyola Law School in 1962. He was a member of Kappa Alpha Psi fraternity, initiated through the Upsilon chapter and the fraternity's 45th Laurel Wreath laureate.

"If you were a person who integrated well, as I was, you got to go to people's houses and envision another life, I knew kids who had things I could only dream of. I remember going to someone's house and seeing a swimming pool. I was like, 'That's great!' Another guy had an archery range in his loft. An archery range! I could not believe it. I had never thought about archery! But it made me get off my butt and say, 'Hey, I can do this!'" - Johnnie Cochran, in The American Lawyer

== Career ==
=== Los Angeles deputy city attorney ===
After passing the California bar exam in 1963, Cochran took a position in Los Angeles as a deputy city attorney in the criminal division, handling drunk driving and misdemeanor battery cases.

In 1964, as a deputy city attorney, Cochran prosecuted Lenny Bruce for alleged obscenity, and couldn't convict the foul-mouthed comedian. In 1996, Cochran conceded that his attempt to convict Lenny Bruce was contrary to the 1st Amendment.

=== Private practice ===
In 1965 Cochran entered private practice with Gerald Lenoir, a well-known local criminal lawyer. In 1966, he opened his own firm, Cochran, Atkins & Evans, in Los Angeles.

In his first notable case, Cochran represented Barbara Deadwyler, an African-American widow who sued several police officers who had shot and killed her husband, Leonard Deadwyler. Though Cochran lost the case, it became a turning point in his career. Rather than seeing the case as a defeat, Cochran realized the trial itself had awakened the black community. In reference to the loss, Cochran wrote in The American Lawyer, "those were extremely difficult cases to win in those days. But what Deadwyler confirmed for me was that this issue of police abuse really galvanized the minority community. It taught me that these cases could really get attention."

By the late 1970s, Cochran had established his reputation in the black community. He litigated a number of high-profile police brutality and criminal cases.

=== Los Angeles County District Attorney's office ===
In 1978, Cochran returned to the Los Angeles County District Attorney's office in the leadership position of First Assistant District Attorney. Though he took a pay cut to do so, joining the government was his way of becoming "one of the good guys, one of the very top rung". He began to strengthen his ties with the political community, alter his image, and work from within to change the system.

=== Return to private practice ===
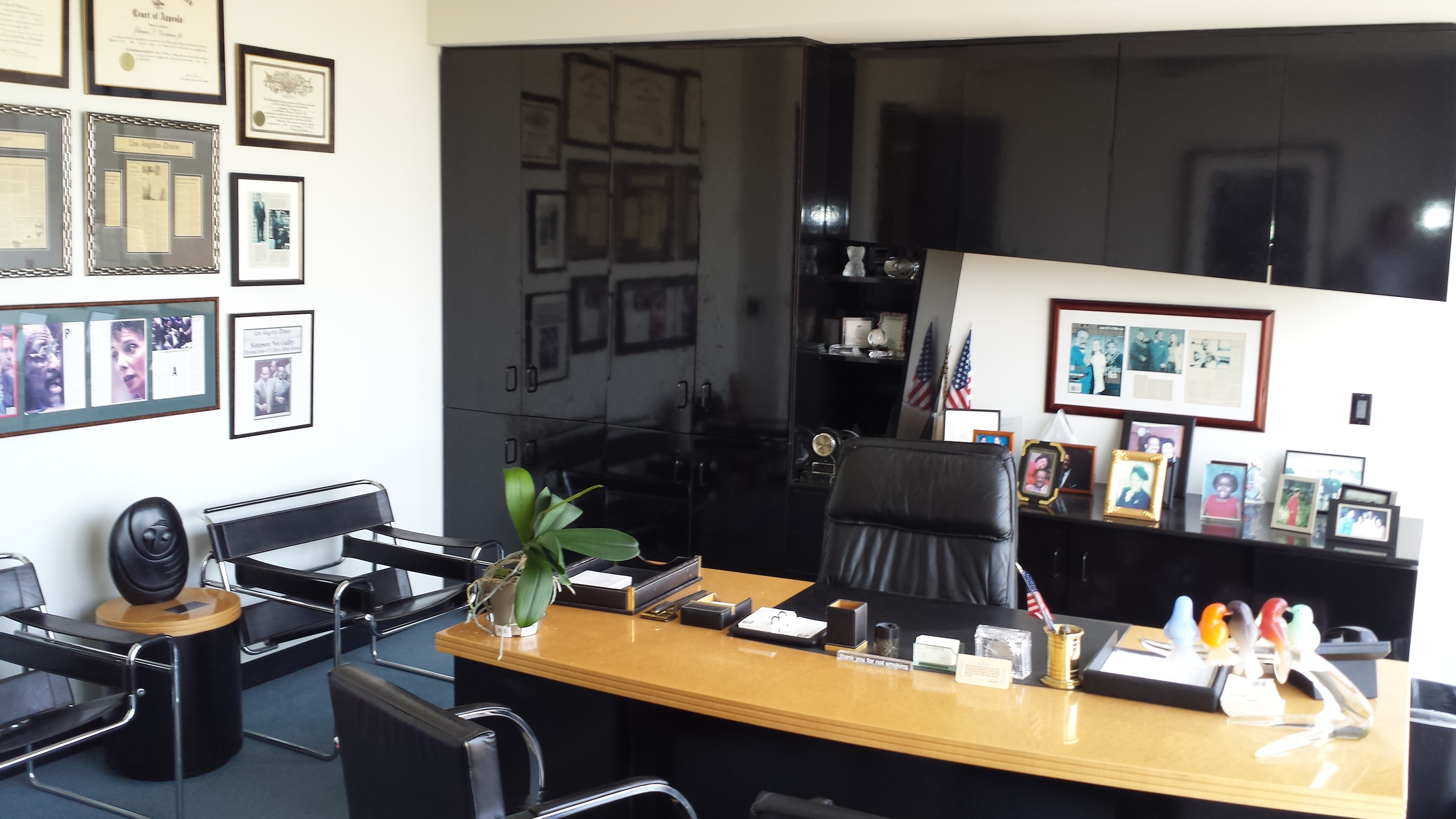
Cochran's office, maintained in his memory at The Cochran Firm, 4929 Wilshire Boulevard, Los Angeles, California

Five years later, Cochran returned to private practice, reinventing himself as "the best in the West" by opening the Johnnie L Cochran Jr. law firm. In contrast to his early loss in the Deadwyler case, Cochran won US$760,000 for the family of Ron Settles, a black college football player who, his family claimed, was murdered by the police. In 1990, Cochran joined a succeeding firm, Cochran, Mitchell & Jenna, and joined Cochran, Cherry, Givens & Smith in 1997. The Cochran Firm has grown to have regional offices located in fifteen states.

In most of his cases Cochran represented plaintiffs in tort actions and opposed tort reform. Due to his success as a lawyer, Cochran could encourage settlement simply by his presence on a case. According to Rev. Jesse Jackson, a call to Johnnie Cochran made "corporations and violators shake."

Cochran's well-honed rhetoric and flamboyance in the courtroom has been described as theatrical. His practice as a lawyer earned him great wealth. With his earnings, he bought and drove cars such as a Jaguar and a Rolls-Royce. He owned homes in Los Angeles, two apartments in West Hollywood and a condo in Manhattan. In 2001, Cochran's accountant estimated that within five years he would be worth US$25–50 million.

== Clients ==
Before the Simpson case, Cochran had achieved a reputation as a "go-to" lawyer for the rich, as well as a successful advocate for minorities in police brutality and civil rights cases. But the controversial and dramatic Simpson trial made Cochran more widely known, generating a more polarized perception of him.

Cochran liked to say that he worked "not only for the OJs, but also the No Js". In other words, he enjoyed defending or suing in the name of those who did not have fame or wealth. Cochran believed his "most glorious" moment as a lawyer was when he won the freedom of Geronimo Pratt. Cochran said he considered Pratt's release "the happiest day" of his legal practice. In the words of Harvard Law School professor Charles Ogletree, Cochran "was willing to fight for the underdog." Jesse Jackson called Cochran the "people's lawyer." Magic Johnson said Cochran was known "for representing O. J. and Michael [Jackson], but he was bigger and better than that".

=== O. J. Simpson ===
In October 1995, after a public trial that lasted nearly nine months and presented both circumstantial and physical evidence that Simpson had killed both victims, Simpson was acquitted. During the trial's closing arguments, Cochran used the phrase, "If it doesn't fit, you must acquit." The phrase, which had been devised by fellow defense team member Gerald Uelmen, was intended to persuade the jury that Simpson could not have murdered Nicole Brown Simpson nor Ron Goldman. In a dramatic scene, Simpson appeared to have difficulty getting the glove on; stained with the blood of both victims and Simpson, it had been found at the crime scene.

Cochran did not represent Simpson in the subsequent civil trial, in which Simpson was found liable for the deaths. Cochran was criticized during the criminal trial by pundits, as well as by prosecutor Christopher Darden, for suggesting that the police were trying to frame Simpson because they were racist. During the trial, Cochran successfully convinced the jury that the prosecution did not prove Simpson was guilty beyond a reasonable doubt and that the police planted evidence against him.

Robert Shapiro, co-counsel on Simpson's defense team, accused Cochran of dealing the "race card" "from the bottom of the deck". Cochran replied that it was "not a case about race, it is a case about reasonable doubt", adding, "there are a lot of white people who are willing to accept this verdict".

=== Abner Louima ===
Cochran represented Abner Louima, a Haitian immigrant living in Brooklyn who was sodomized with a broken broomstick by officer Justin Volpe while in police custody. Louima was awarded an $8.75 million settlement, the largest police brutality settlement in New York City history. Tension broke out between Louima's original lawyers and the new team headed by Cochran. The former team felt that Cochran and his colleagues were trying to take control of the entire trial.

=== Sean Combs ===
In 2001, Sean (P. Diddy) Combs was indicted on bribery and stolen weapons charges. He hired Cochran for his defense. Cochran fought for Combs's freedom, and Combs was acquitted.

In 2002, Cochran told Combs that this would be his last criminal case. Cochran retired after the trial. R. Kelly and Allen Iverson later asked for his services in criminal cases, but he declined to represent them.

=== Stanley Tookie Williams ===
Cochran defended 17-year-old Stanley Tookie Williams in a robbery trial in the early 1970s. Williams was a known member of the Westside Crips street gang. After less than 10 minutes of deliberation, a jury acquitted Williams of all charges.

Years later, Williams was arrested for assaulting LAPD personnel, and was acquitted, with Cochran again serving as his counsel.

Cochran did not represent Williams at his multiple murder trials in the 1980s.

=== Michael Jackson ===
Cochran also represented Michael Jackson when he was accused of child molestation in 1993. Jackson and his accuser settled the case out of court. When Jackson faced criminal charges for further molestation allegations in 2004, his family sought advice from Cochran, who recommended defense attorney Thomas Mesereau.

== Personal life ==
From 1960 to 1977, Cochran was married to Barbara Jean (née Berry) Cochran, she first filed for divorce in 1967.

His marriage finally ended in divorce, when it was revealed, that he had a son with Patricia Sikora, a longtime mistress, who later filed a palimony lawsuit against Cochran, settled in 2004.

From 1985 to 2005, Cochran was married to Sylvia Dale (née Mason) Cochran.

== Illness and death ==
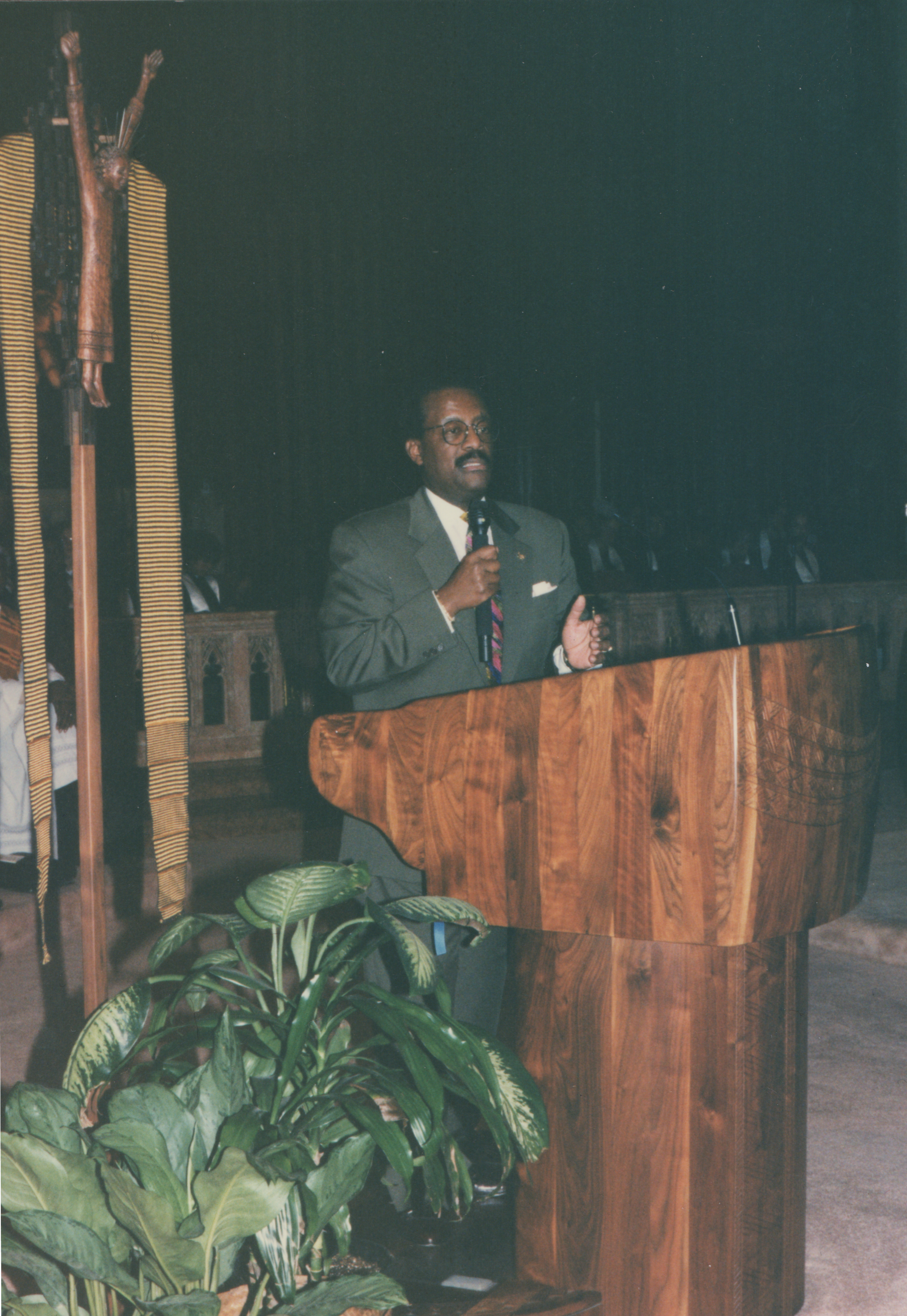
Johnnie Cochran speaking at St. Sabina Catholic Church, Chicago

In December 2003, Cochran was diagnosed with a brain tumor. In April 2004, he underwent surgery, which led him to stay away from the media. Shortly thereafter, he told the New York Post that he was feeling well and was in good health.

He died from the brain tumor on March 29, 2005, at his home in Los Angeles. Public viewing of his casket was conducted on April 4, at the Angelus Funeral Home and April 5, at Second Baptist Church, in Los Angeles. A memorial service was held at West Angeles Cathedral, in Los Angeles, on April 6, 2005. His remains were interred in the Inglewood Park Cemetery in Inglewood, California. The funeral was attended by his father, Johnnie Sr., as well as numerous former friends and clients, including O. J. Simpson and Michael Jackson.

== Posthumous ruling ==
On May 31, 2005, two months after Cochran's death, the U.S. Supreme Court delivered its opinion in Tory v. Cochran. The court ruled 7–2 that in light of Cochran's death, an injunction limiting the demonstrations of Ulysses Tory "amounts to an overly broad prior restraint upon speech." Two justices, Antonin Scalia and Clarence Thomas, said that Cochran's death made it unnecessary for the court to rule. Lower courts, before Cochran died, held that Tory could not make any public comments about Cochran.

== Legacy ==
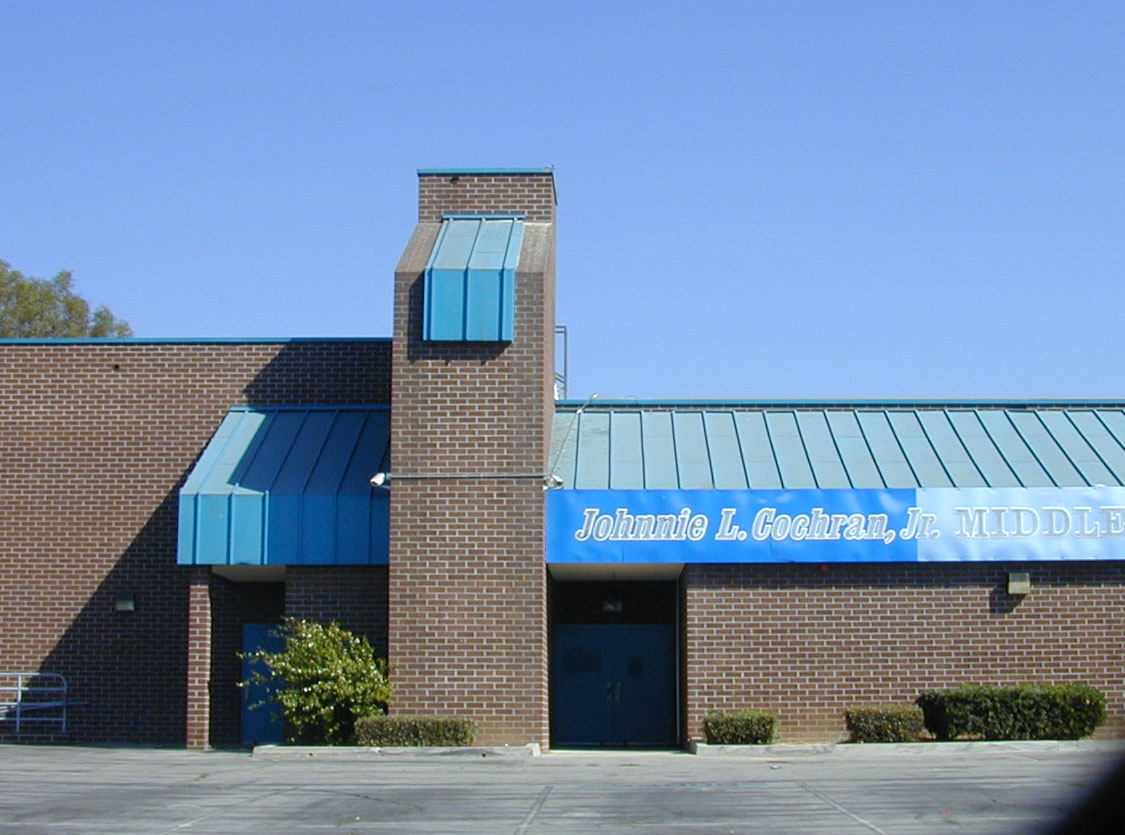
Johnnie L Cochran Jr. Middle School (formerly Mt. Vernon Jr. High) in Los Angeles

- On January 24, 2006, Los Angeles Unified School District officials unanimously approved the renaming of Mount Vernon Middle School, Cochran's boyhood middle school, to Johnnie L Cochran Jr. Middle School in his honor. The decision received mixed responses.
- In 2007, the three-block stretch of the street in front of the school was renamed "Johnnie Cochran Vista".
- In 2007, Cedars-Sinai Medical Center in Los Angeles opened the new Johnnie L Cochran Jr. Brain Tumor Center, a research center headed by noted neurosurgeon Keith Black, who had been Cochran's doctor.
- Cochran's family created an endowed chair, the Johnnie L Cochran Jr. Chair in Civil Rights, at his alma mater, Loyola Law School of Loyola Marymount University.
- Cochran's footprints are featured on the Northwest Louisiana Walk of Stars in his hometown of Shreveport, Louisiana.

== Depictions in media ==
After the Simpson trial, Cochran was a frequent commentator in law-related television shows. Additionally, he hosted his own show, Johnnie Cochran Tonight, on CourtTV. With the Simpson fame also came movie deals.

Actor Phil Morris played attorney Jackie Chiles, a character parody of Cochran, in several episodes of Seinfeld. He was satirized in the "Chef Aid" episode of the animated sitcom South Park (voiced by series co-creator Trey Parker) in which he appears using a confusing legal strategy called "the Chewbacca defense", a direct parody of his closing argument when defending O. J. Simpson. Cochran took these parodies in his stride, discussing them in his autobiography, A Lawyer's Life. Additionally, he appeared as himself in The Hughleys, Family Matters, The Howard Stern Show, Arli$$, CHiPs '99, Bamboozled, Showtime, Martin, and JAG.

Ving Rhames played Cochran in the film American Tragedy (2000).

Cochran appears briefly as a character in the 2011 musical comedy The Book of Mormon, where he is depicted as being in Hell (alongside Genghis Khan, Jeffrey Dahmer, and Adolf Hitler) for "getting O. J. free".

Cochran was portrayed in The People v. O. J. Simpson: American Crime Story (2016) by actor Courtney B. Vance. In the series, Cochran is depicted as believing that Simpson is responsible for the murders and initially reluctant to be part of the Dream Team, convinced that they will lose. Cochran also serves as a composite character with Gerald Uelman, who was omitted from the series, taking Uelman's place as the lawyer who cross-examines Fuhrman for the second time, and who comes up with "If it doesn't fit, you must acquit." Vance won the Primetime Emmy Award for Outstanding Lead Actor in a Limited Series or Movie for his performance.
