= California Insurance Code =

California Insurance Law

The California Insurance Code are the codified California laws regarding insurance. The code not only covers requirements for home, auto, medical and business insurance policies, but also covers the licensing of bail bond agents, workers' compensation, motor club services, and other related business types. Topics include: classes of insurance, code provisions governing the insurance commissioner, laws pertaining to insurance adjusters, insurance contracts, liability limitations, and common carrier liability insurance. The California Department of Insurance oversees the enforcement of the code and execution of its policies.

== History ==
=== Slavery Era Insurance Registry ===
In September 2000, Governor Gray Davis signed State Bill 2199 into law, adding a provision into the California Insurance Code for creation of a Slavery Era Insurance Registry. The bill was created with the intent of preserving historical information regarding slave owners and their slaves in order to provide genealogical research information for slave descendants as well as to preserve possible evidence for potential reparation claims. The bill requires insurance companies to provide the California Department of Insurance with any historical records regarding slaveholder insurance policies issued by any predecessor corporation during the era of slavery. The information collected is to be made available to the public by the Department.

=== Rescission Provision Upheld ===
Under the code sections 331 and 359, when an insured has misrepresented or concealed facts which are material to the application for insurance, the underwriter may rescind the policy. On March 8, 2005, the California Court of Appeal's 2nd Appellate District Div. Five affirmed and enforced California's Marine Rule in James E. Mitchell, Individually and as Trustee of the Mitchell Family Trust vs. United National Ins. Co.. The summary finding stated:

[A]n insurer may, under [California] Insurance Code sections 331 and 359, rescind a fire insurance policy based on an insured's negligent or unintentional misrepresentation of a material fact in an insurance application, notwithstanding the willful misrepresentation clause included in the required standard form fire insurance policy (Insurance Code sections 2070 and 2071).

== See also ==
- Law of California
- Insurance
- Insurance law
- California Department of Insurance
- California Health and Safety Code
