= Michael Jackson fandom =

Michael Jackson fans are individuals who admire and support the work of American singer, songwriter, and dancer Michael Jackson. They are sometimes referred to as Moonwalkers (or Soldiers of Love). Michael Jackson's fanbase is one of the largest in the world, with numerous media outlets reporting that he reached billions of fans over his four-decade career.

Jackson was one of the first artists to redefine the relationship between artists and fans by forming a strong bond with his devoted fan base. Through personal interactions, charitable gestures, and consideration of their interests, Jackson cultivated loyalty among his fans. Despite facing intense media scrutiny, including the 1993 child sexual abuse allegations and subsequent 2005 trial, his fans continued to support him throughout his career. The fan community has contributed to preserving Jackson's legacy, promoting his music, and supporting charitable initiatives inspired by his philanthropic work.

== History ==
=== Jacksonmania ===
During the 1970s when Michael was a member of the Jackson 5, he and his brothers would embark on worldwide tours, performing in front of millions of fans while recording hits at a rapid pace during Jacksonmania. Adulation from fans young and old, male and female, black and white, would become par for the course. Jacksonmania would reach a fever pitch around 1984, which saw three generations gather in front of a TV set in many households to watch the Thriller music video. In 1987, Jackson released the album Bad which ended up selling 18 million copies in the first year That same year, the Bad World Tour began and ended up setting the record at the time for highest-grossing concert, and Jackson ended the decade with over 110 million records sold.

In 1991, the Black or White music video debuted to over 500 million fans worldwide on Fox, following that every music video from the album Dangerous received a worldwide TV premiere. In 1992, The Jacksons: An American Dream premiered on ABC averaging 36-38 million viewers across 2 episodes. In 1993, Jackson performed at halftime during Super Bowl XXVII, and the broadcast was seen by a record 133 million viewers in the United States and an estimated 1.3 billion viewers worldwide. That same year, Jackson had numerous broadcasts in which including a televised interview with Oprah Winfrey which was watched by 90 million viewers. Jacksonmania experienced a resurrection days after his death on June 25, 2009. Within the weeks that followed his death, as he would go on to sell 35 million records worldwide and by June 2010, he had sold over 70 million records. In the United States alone, he sold 48 million records in the 10 years since his death with over 117 million worldwide.

== Reaction to child sexual abuse allegations against Jackson ==
=== Reaction to first child sexual abuse allegations ===
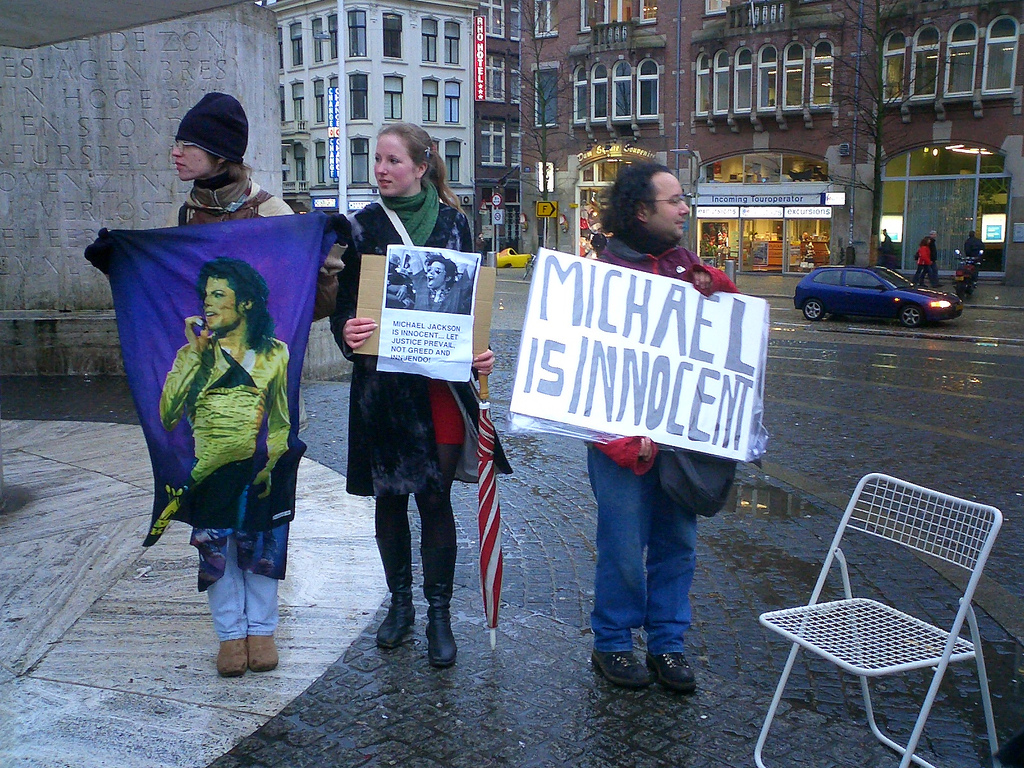
Three Jackson fans protesting his innocence in Amsterdam, 2004

Despite the negative attitude of the media, the public still supported Jackson. A phone-in poll conducted by A Current Affair—known for its unfavorable coverage of the allegations—found that more than 80 percent of callers did not believe the Chandlers. A poll of teenagers—Jackson's central fan base at the time—also reported that 75 percent did not believe the allegations; this rose to nearly 90 percent amongst African-American teenagers. Two-thirds of children between the ages of 13 and 15—the approximate age of Jordan Chandler at the time—believed he was innocent. A poll conducted by Entertainment Weekly showed that only 12 percent of adults believed the allegations, and only eight percent of respondents indicated that they were less likely to buy a product endorsed by the entertainer. The same poll also concluded that public opinion of Jackson had risen since the allegations, with Jackson's records selling at a faster rate.

=== Reaction to second sexual abuse allegations ===
Fans continued to support Jackson in the 2005 trial. Fans unfavorably felt about the media coverage of the case accusing it of being biased, demonizing Jackson and jeopardizing his chances for a fair trial. They came in throngs from all over the world to gather outside the Santa Barbara County Courthouse in Santa Maria during jury selection holding signs of support. Some continued to show their support when Jackson was hospitalized with flu, gathering outside the Marian Medical Center where he was staying. Jackson's fans continued to show their support throughout his trial.

== Global fan presence ==
Jackson's influence spans the globe, with active fan communities in numerous countries and territories. This section highlights nations where his legacy remains prominent, through physical visits, tribute events, posthumous honors, mourning, or ongoing fan-driven recognition.

=== Africa ===
- Algeria
- Angola
- Benin
- Botswana
- Burundi
- Burkina Faso
- Cameroon
- Cape Verde
- Chad
- Central Africa Republic
- Congo
- Democratic Republic of the Congo
- Djibouti
- Egypt
- Ethiopia
- Eritrea
- Equatorial Guinea
- Gabon
- Gambia
- Ghana
- Guinea
- Guinea-Bissau
- Ivory Coast
- Kenya
- Lesotho
- Liberia
- Libya
- Madagascar
- Malawi
- Mali
- Mauritius
- Mauritania
- Morocco
- Mozambique
- Namibia
- Niger
- Nigeria
- Rwanda
- São Tomé and Príncipe
- Senegal
- Seychelles
- Sierra Leone
- Somalia
- South Africa
- South Sudan
- Sudan
- Swaziland
- Tanzania
- Tunisia
- Uganda
- Zambia
- Zimbabwe

=== Asia ===
- Afghanistan
- Armenia
- Azerbaijan
- Bahrain
- Bangladesh
- Bhutan
- Brunei
- Cambodia
- China
- Cyprus
- Georgia
- India
- Indonesia
- Iran
- Iraq
- Israel
- Japan
- Jordan
- Kazakhstan
- Kuwait
- Kyrgyzstan
- Laos
- Lebanon
- Malaysia
- Maldives
- Myanmar
- Mongolia
- Nepal
- Oman
- Pakistan
- Philippines
- Qatar
- Saudi Arabia
- Singapore
- South Korea
- Sri Lanka
- Syria
- Tajikistan
- Timor-Leste
- Thailand
- Turkey
- Turkmenistan
- United Arab Emirates
- Uzbekistan
- Vietnam
- Yemen

=== Dependencies and territories ===
- Andorra
- Aruba
- Bermuda
- Curaçao
- Cayman Islands
- Georgia
- Gibraltar
- Guadeloupe
- Guernsey
- Holy See
- Hong Kong
- Isle of Man
- Kosovo
- Macau
- Martinique
- Mayotta
- Monaco
- New Caledonia
- Niue
- Reunion
- San Marino
- Sint Maarten
- Solomon Islands
- Taiwan
- Tristen De Cunha

=== Europe ===
- Albania
- Armenia
- Austria
- Belgium
- Belarus
- Bosnia and Herzegovina
- Bulgaria
- Croatia
- Czech Republic
- Denmark
- Estonia
- Finland
- France
- Germany
- Greece
- Hungary
- Iceland
- Italy
- Ireland
- Latvia
- Liechtenstein
- Lithuania
- Luxembourg
- Malta
- Moldova
- Montenegro
- Netherlands
- North Macedonia
- Norway
- Poland
- Portugal
- Romania
- Russia
- Serbia
- Slovakia
- Spain
- Sweden
- Switzerland
- Slovenia
- Ukraine
- United Kingdom

=== North America ===
- Anguilla
- Antigua and Barbuda
- Bahamas
- Barbados
- Belize
- Canada
- Costa Rica
- Cuba
- Dominica
- Dominican Republic
- El Salvador
- Guatemala
- Haiti
- Honduras
- Jamaica
- Mexico
- Nicaragua
- Panama
- Puerto Rico
- Trinidad and Tobago
- St Lucia
- Saint Vincent and the Grenadines

=== Oceania ===
- Australia
- Fiji
- French Polynesia
- Guam
- Marshall Islands
- Micronesia
- New Zealand
- Papua New Guinea
- Samoa
- Solomon Islands
- Tonga
- Vanuatu

=== South America ===
- Argentina
- Bolivia
- Brazil
- Chile
- Colombia
- Ecuador
- French Guinea
- Guyana
- Paraguay
- Peru
- Suriname
- Uruguay
- Venezuela

Global Fandom Reach - 200+ Countries

== List of active Michael Jackson fan club websites ==
The following is a list of notable active Michael Jackson fan club websites from around the world. These clubs maintain dedicated online platforms that provide news, archives, forums, and organize fan activities to celebrate and preserve the legacy of Michael Jackson.

=== International/English-language ===
- MJ Vibe – One of the largest modern Michael Jackson fan hubs, featuring news, products, interviews, and home of "Iconic" magazine and King of Shop. MJ Vibe is often mentioned in news articles like in Forbes
- MJJCommunity – Global Michael Jackson fan forum and community active since the early 2000s.
- Michael Jackson World Network (MJWN) – The UK's official long-running fan club offering news, competitions, and tributes.

=== France ===
- MJFrance – The largest French Michael Jackson fan club website, established in the 1990s, offering extensive archives and interviews.

=== Switzerland ===
- Jackson.ch – Switzerland's primary Michael Jackson fan site, providing German-language news, event reports, and tributes.

=== Ireland ===
- MJJStreet – Ireland-based fan site with a focus on news, advocacy against tabloid stories, and fan activism.

=== Germany ===
- MJUpbeat – A prominent German Michael Jackson fan club website providing news updates and fan resources.
- MJFS (Michael Jackson Fan Square) – German-language site offering local MJ news, discussions, and media archives.

=== Netherlands ===
- The Magical Child (TMC) – Dutch Michael Jackson fan club with international membership and a long-standing online presence.

=== Belgium ===
- The Living Legend – Belgian fan club dedicated to preserving Michael Jackson's legacy, with European event involvement.

=== Australia ===
- MJ50 – Australian-based fan community focusing on celebrating Michael Jackson's music and history.

=== Spain ===
- Michael Jackson HideOut – The largest Spanish-speaking fan community with active forums and event discussions.

=== Poland ===
- MJStreetLegends – Leading Polish Michael Jackson fan site with translations, event coverage, and community projects.

== Michael Jackson fan magazines ==
Fans have actively produced magazines dedicated to Michael Jackson since the early 1990s. These publications have documented his music, humanitarian work, and influence on popular culture, often featuring exclusive interviews, photographs, and fan art. Below is a list of notable fan magazines, including their countries of publication, publication spans, and references from independent catalogues, commercial archives, or ISBN/ISSN records.

Magazine	Country	Issues	Years	Ref.
Black & White	France/Germany	33	1992–2001 (+2009)	French edition: "ISSN record for Black & white (Eaubonne)". The ISSN Portal. German edition: "ISSN record for Black & white (Deutsche Ausg.)". The ISSN Portal.
King! Magazine	UK	24	1994–2002	"King! Magazine archive". King-of-Shop.
Iconic Magazine	UK	24	2010–2017	"ISSN record for Iconic Magazine". ISSN Portal.
Off the Wall Magazine	UK	28	1993–2005	"Off The Wall Magazine tribute". MJWorld.
MJ Backstage	Belgium	32	1995–2020	"MJ Backstage official site". MJBackstage.
On the Line Magazine	UK	2	early 2000s	Michael Jackson Fandom. Routledge. 2020. p. 142. ISBN 9780415806955.
Jackson Magazine	Netherlands	~19	2001–2019	"Jackson Magazine archive". JacksonSource.
MJJ Magazine	UK	14	2012–2015	Michael Jackson: MJJ Magazine Photobook. AbeBooks. ISBN 0955540739.
Invincible Magazine	France	11	2014–2016	"Invincible Magazine discussion". MJJCommunity. July 2, 2009.
JAM Magazine	France	2	2019	Pearlman, Samantha (2020). Michael Jackson Fandom: Performing Community in the King of Pop. Routledge. p. 142. ISBN 9780367335126.

== Michael Jackson podcasts ==
Several podcasts focus on Michael Jackson's life, music, and legacy. Notable examples include:

- The MJ Cast – A podcast dedicated to all things Michael Jackson, including music, news, and fan discussions.
- The Big MJ Debate – A podcast packed with controversial and hilarious debates among Michael Jackson Fans, hosted by Pez Jax and Charlotte McLachlan.
- Michael Jackson's Journey from Motown to Off the Wall – Podcast covering Michael Jackson's early career and artistic evolution.
- The King of Pop Podcast – Focuses on Michael Jackson's musical impact and fan stories.
- Thriller Night with Robby – Discussions and stories about Michael Jackson's Thriller era and beyond.
- Michael Jackson On the Beat – Covers MJ's music production and legacy.
- Moonwalker Podcast – In-depth episodes focusing on MJ's career highlights and cultural influence.

== Reaction to Jackson's death ==
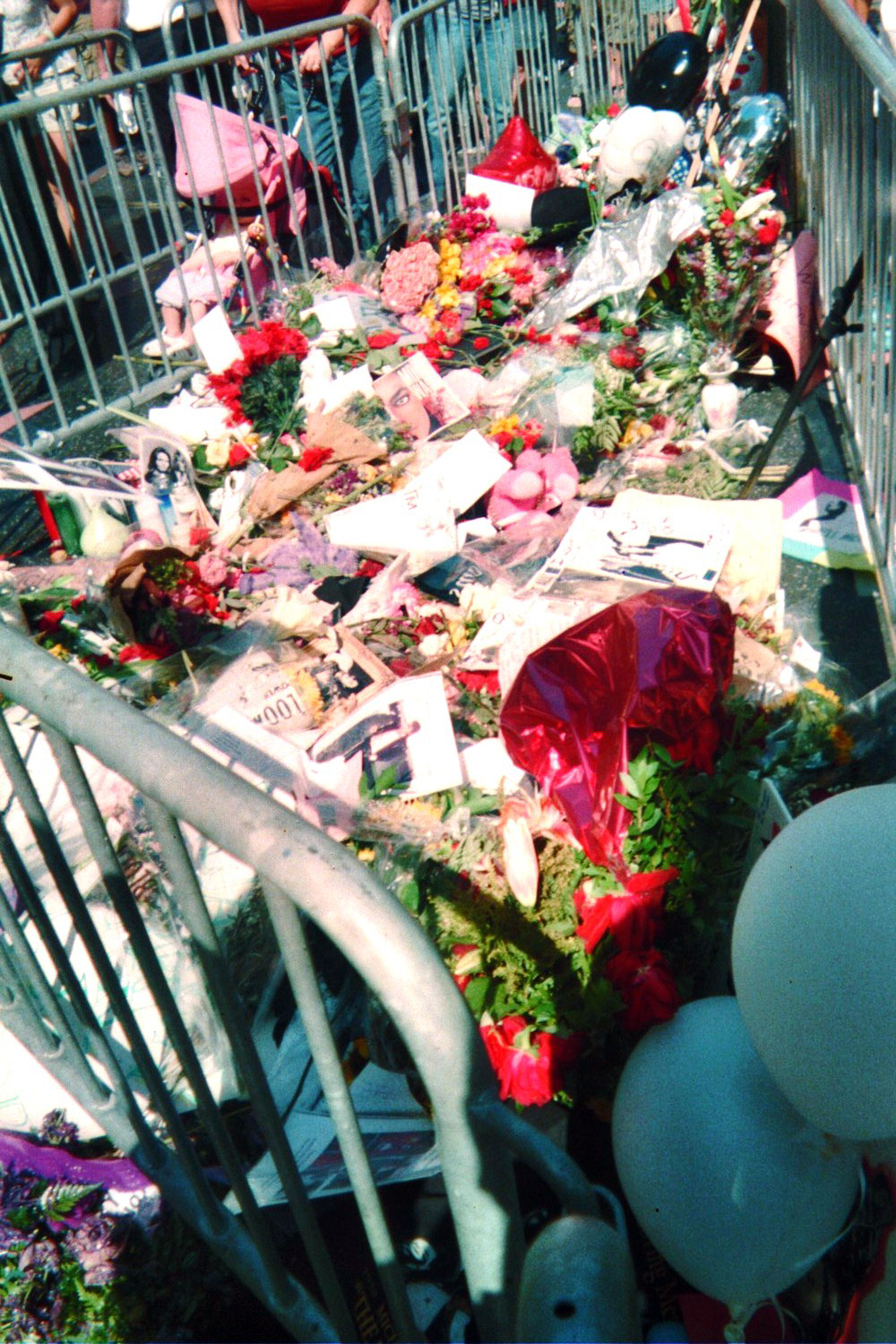
Jackson's star on the Hollywood Walk of Fame became a focal point for public grief.

News of Jackson's death triggered an outpouring of grief around the world. Fans gathered outside the UCLA Medical Center, Neverland Ranch, his Holmby Hills home, the Hayvenhurst Jackson family home in Encino, the Apollo Theater in New York, and at Hitsville U.S.A., the old Motown headquarters in Detroit where Jackson's career began, now the Motown Museum. Streets around the hospital were blocked off, and across America people left offices and factories to watch the breaking news on television. A small crowd, including the city's mayor, gathered outside his childhood home in Gary, where the flag on city hall was flown at half staff in his honor. Fans in Hollywood initially gathered around the Walk of Fame star of another Michael Jackson, as they were unable to access Jackson's star, which had been temporarily covered by equipment in place for the Brüno film premiere. Grieving fans and memorial tributes relocated from the talk radio host's star the next day.

From Odesa to Brussels, and beyond, fans held their own memorial gatherings.

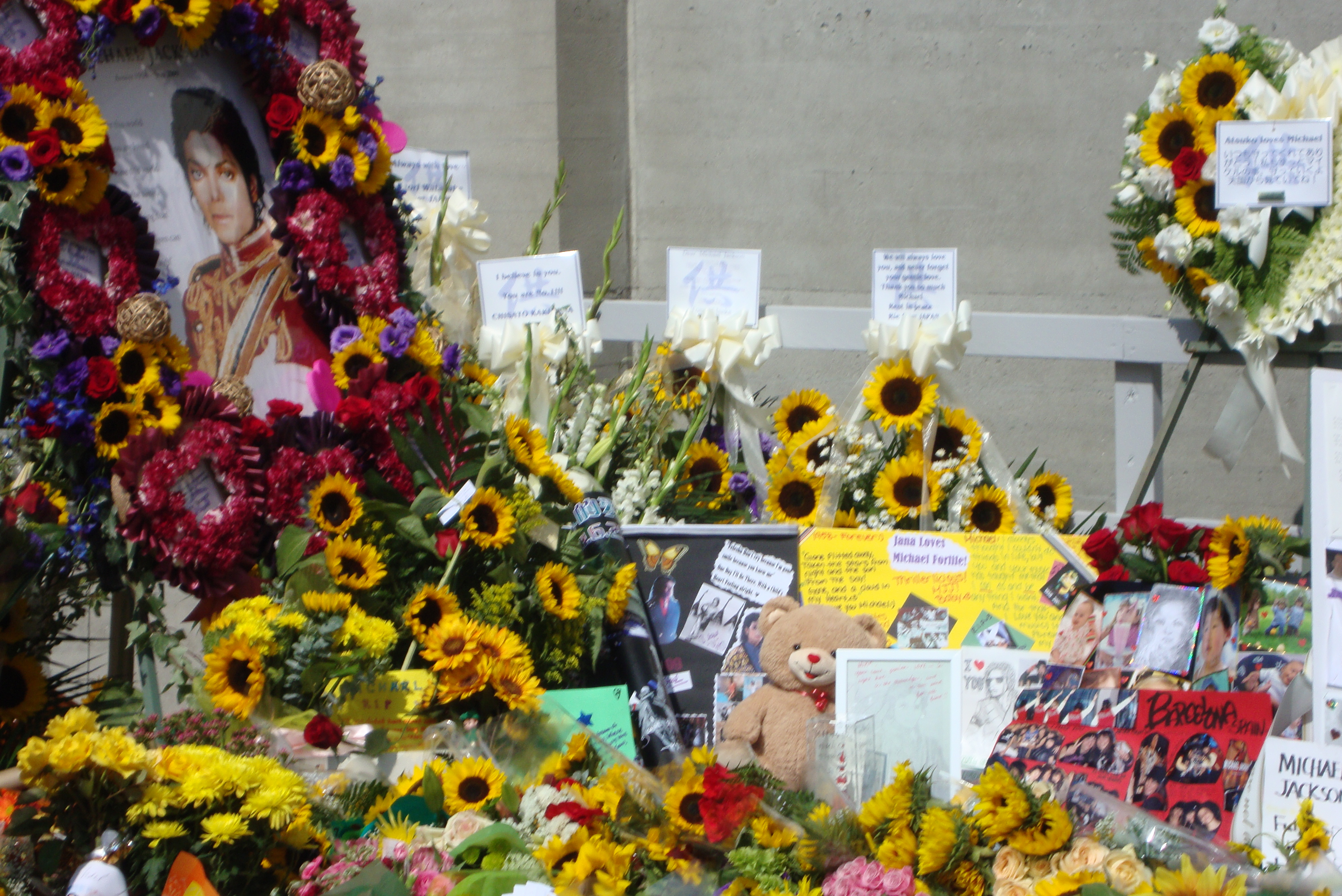
Tribute of fans from all over the world in the Forest Lawn Memorial Park on the first anniversary of his death

On June 25, 2010, the first anniversary of Jackson's death, fans traveled to Los Angeles to pay tribute. They visited Jackson's star on the Hollywood Walk of Fame, his family home, and Forest Lawn Memorial Park. Many carried sunflowers and other tributes to leave at the sites.

On June 26, 2010, fans marched in front of the Los Angeles Police Department's Robbery-Homicide Division at the old Parker Center building, and assembled a petition with thousands of signatures, demanding justice in the homicide investigation.

In 2014, 34 members of the French-based Michael Jackson Community fan club sued Jackson's doctor Conrad Murray for the emotional damage caused by the singer's death. Five of them were awarded one euro each since they were able to prove their suffering. Their lawyer, Emmanuel Ludot, stated that to his knowledge this was "the first time in the world that the notion of emotional damage in connection with a popstar has been recognised".

== Fan activism ==
On December 10, 2010, as a promotion of Jackson's first posthumous album Michael, a 29,070-square-foot (2,701 m^{2}) poster depicting the album artwork from Michael was erected at the Rectory Farm in Middlesex, England, by fans which broke a Guinness World Record for the largest poster in the world.

In 2019, after the release of HBO's documentary Leaving Neverland, Jackson fans demanded the Sundance Film Festival cancel the premiere. Fans protested outside Channel 4's office, and led an internet campaign against the film. They also crowdfunded an advertising campaign to publicise Jackson's innocence, with the slogan "Facts don't lie. People do" on buses and bus stops.

In July 2019, three Jackson fan clubs in France, Michael Jackson Community, the MJ Street and On the Line, have filed a suit against two of the late alleged abuse victims for sullying his image in Leaving Neverland, using the defamation laws that make it an offence to wrongly sully the image of a dead person. US or British laws do not provide such protection to the deceased.

== Notable Michael Jackson fan events ==
Below is a list of notable active fan-organized events celebrating Michael Jackson's life and legacy, excluding tribute musicals and impersonator shows:

- MJ MusicDay (France)

Annual event organized by the association *On the Line*, featuring musicians who collaborated with Michael Jackson, fan discussions, and live performances. The next edition is scheduled for November 8, 2026.

- MJ Day – Worldwide Birthday Celebrations

Global fan-organized events held every August 29 to celebrate Michael Jackson's birthday through flash mobs, parties, and online activities.

- Michael Jackson Art Exhibitions & Memorabilia Shows

Exhibitions organized by fans showcasing MJ memorabilia, photography, and fan art, frequently held in galleries or cultural centers.

- Global MJ Flash Mobs & Dance Events

Coordinated flash mobs and public dance events worldwide that celebrate iconic Michael Jackson choreography on anniversaries and special dates.

- MJ Charity & Awareness Walks (non-profit fan organized)

Fan-initiated charity walks and awareness events supporting causes close to Michael Jackson's heart, held annually in various locations.

- Forever Michael

The Jackson Family Foundation, in conjunction with Voiceplate, presented "Forever Michael", an event bringing together Jackson family members, celebrities, fans, supporters and the community to celebrate and honor his legacy. A portion of the proceeds were presented to some of Jackson's favorite charities.

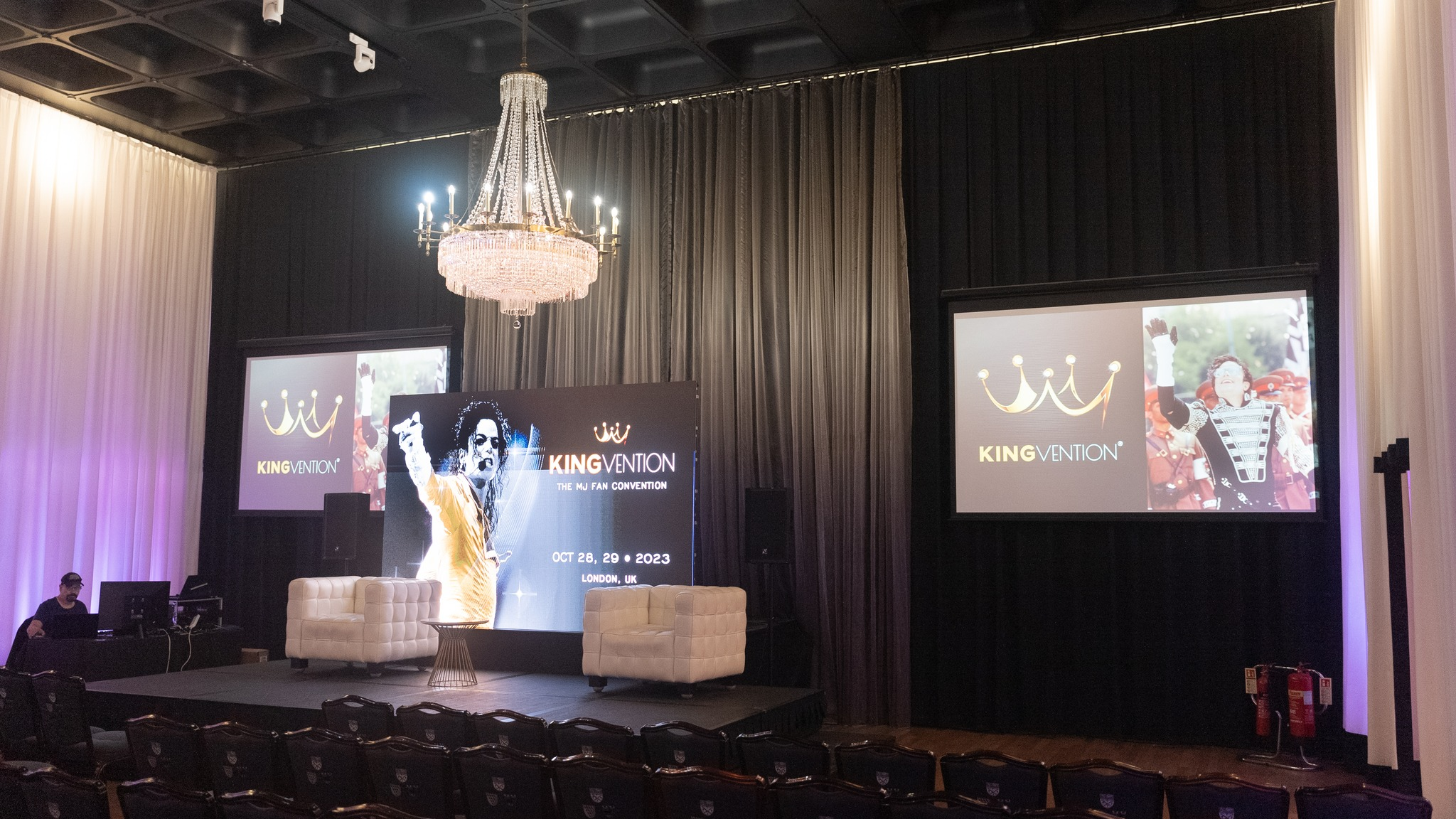
Kingvention stage at the Glaziers Hall, London, in October 2023

== Kingvention ==
Kingvention is an annual fan convention dedicated to celebrating the life, music, and legacy of Michael Jackson. Established in 2015, it is recognized as the only European convention exclusively focused on Jackson and his global fan base. The event features rare memorabilia exhibitions, panel discussions with individuals who worked directly with Jackson, film screenings, and live performances.

In 2024, Kingvention expanded internationally with its first U.S. edition held in Los Angeles, featuring panels and exhibitions with artists and collaborators connected to Michael Jackson.

Kingvention has also collaborated with Propstore on multiple occasions to display original Michael Jackson costumes, including the "Next Generation" Pepsi jacket and the "Spike" rabbit costume from Moonwalker, ahead of public auctions.

Year	Location	Name of Event	Guest Speakers	Activities	Number of fan attended
2015	Park Plaza Victoria, London	HIStory 20	Diana Walczak; Rob Hoffman; Jonathan Morrish; Eddie Wolfl	Diana Walczak Collection; Behind The Scream Gallery; The Making of Moonwalke; The convention opened with a live performance of Michael Jackson's "They Don't Care About Us" by Batala London	250
2016	Park Plaza Victoria, London	Dangerous 25	Dan Beck; Yuko Jackson; Jonathan Morrish; Thom Russo.	Captain Eo: From page to Screen; The Making of Moonwalker; Steven Paul Whitsitt Gallery; The convention opened with a live performance from the London International Gospel Choir (LIGC)	300
2017	Park Plaza Victoria, London	Access All Areas	Dorian Holley, Eddie Garcia, and Steven Paul Whitsitt	The Making of Moonwalker; The Live Gallery; The convention opened with a live performance from SupaFresh Dance Movement	320
2019	The Pullman Hotel and Shaw Theatre, London	The Man, The Music, The Legend	Siedah Garrett; Larry Stessel; Darryl Phinnessee	Forever Neverland; Behind The Mask; Pre-recorded messages from Former colleagues and guest speakers; The convention opened with a live performance from Otis Phoenix aka "The kid of Pop" & Funk of the Future, a London base Dance group	400
2020	Online	KV:GLOBAL	Jean-Marie Horvat; Bill Bottrell	A live performance of Liberian Girl by Eddi Goma; An exclusive interview with Engineer Jean-Marie Horvat; A Special taping of 'The Hector Barjot Show'; Clips from Kingvention 2019, 2017 and 2016; An exclusive interview with Bill Bottrell; Moonwalker: Origin Story; A live performance of Billie Jean by Dorian Holley	3,000
2021	Patch East, London	Kingvention Presents: Burn This Disco Out	n/a	In 2021, following the easing of COVID-19 restrictions in the United Kingdom, Kingvention organized a special event on August 28 to celebrate Michael Jackson's birthday. Titled "Kingvention Presents: Burn This Disco Out", the event featured over six hours of music exclusively by Michael Jackson, The Jackson 5, and The Jacksons, performed by DJ Wiz.	100
2022	The Pullman Hotel and Shaw Theatre, London	For All Time	Allan 'Big Al' Scanlan; Bill Bottrell; Kevin Dorsey; LaVelle Smith Jr.	Forever Neverland: An informative exhibit on Neverland Ranch. First-hand interviews, fact displays, a timeline and stunning images getting guests who walked through the re-created gates of Neverland.; 2000 Watts: a 3D Stereoscopic experience; Lavelles Smith Jr's GHOSTS masterclass; Thriller 40: The Album through the years; Wall of Fame: All Kingvention's special guests on picture.; Burn This Disco Out, the after-party of the convention	550
2023	The Glaziers Hall, London	The Maestro	Nicholas Pike; Rupert Wainwright; Cindera Che; Craig Lamont Parks	Screening of Michael Jackson's GHOSTS; Screening of Michael Jackson's MOONWALKER; Premiere of the Documentary ‘Walking On The Moon’; Is It Scary & Club 30's After-Party; Propstore exhibits: Michael Jackson's Pepsi 'New Generation' Commercial Jacket and Michael Jackson's 'Spike' costume; Michael Jackson & Japan: Nobuyuki Momose to showcase some of his amazing Michael Jackson items directly from Japan; HIStory Teaser Exhibition; In The Neverland Library: Discussion session; Moonwalker Exhibits; Janet Jackson special Exhibits	400
2024	House of Cocotte, Los Angeles	Remember The Time	Cindera Che; Darryl Phinnessee; Eddie Garcia; Alif Sankey; Clay Tave; Ashlei Tave; Betty Pecha Madden; Bill Whitfield; Bonnie Sinclair; Donna Schultz; Dorian Holley; Nicholas Pike; Rob Hoffman; Siedah Garrett	Special Performance “2BAD/Thriller” choreographed by Eddie Garcia; Screening of the Documentary ‘Walking On The Moon’; Burn This Disco Out After-Party; Propstore exhibits.; ‘2000 Watts - a 3D Exhibition’; Janet Jackson special Exhibits	114
2025	Conway Hall, London	Rock With You	Dave Way; Bill Nation; Alif Sankey	3D Screening of Michael Jackson's HIStory Short Films; Screening of Michael Jackson's Upscaled Collection; The Brentwood Imperial Youth Marching Band; Burn This Disco Out After-Party; In The Neverland Library: Discussion session; Janet Jackson special Exhibits	275
2025	Fount Studios (formally known as The Hit Factory)	HIStory Begins	Dan Beck; Steven Paul Whitsitt; Diana Walczak; Linda Ury Greenberg; Lisa Kramer; La’Verne Perry-Kennedy; Lori Lambert	3D Screening of Michael Jackson's HIStory Short Films; Dan Beck's book signing You've Got Michael; Diana Walczak's original HIStory Statue on display for the first time since its creation; Michael Jackson's former photographer Steven Paul Whitsitt offered fans a unique photo opportunity, recreating the iconic 1994 backdrop used by Jackson and Lisa Marie Presley.	95 in person, 80 online
2026	Glaziers Hall	Dangerous! The Party	Hugo Huizar; Bill Wolfer; Seth Smith		

== Charity and fundraising ==
Michael Jackson Fans For Charity (MJFFC) is a fan-made charity inspired by Jackson.

Michael Jackson's Legacy is a fan made charity organization that has donated nearly 200,000 dollars to charity and humanitarian causes around the world since the singer's death in 2009, their efforts include building schools, homes and Clinics in Michael Jackson's name:

== Awards ==
The MJJCommunity won Best Fan Forum at the O Music Awards 2011.

== See also ==
- Beatlemania, from which Jacksonmania gets its name
- Thrill the World, an annual gathering of fans each October
