= They Don't Care About Us =

Single by Michael Jackson

from the album HIStory: Past, Present and Future, Book I
- Released: April 8, 1996
- Recorded: 1990; 1994–1995
- Genre: Pop rock; rap rock; dancehall; blues; samba-reggae
- Length: 4:44 (album version); 4:11 (LP edit)
- Label: Epic
- Songwriter: Michael Jackson
- Producer: Michael Jackson

Michael Jackson singles chronology
"Why" (1996)	"They Don't Care About Us" (1996)	"Stranger in Moscow" (1996)

Music videos
- "They Don't Care About Us" (Brazil version) on YouTube; "They Don't Care About Us" (Prison version) on YouTube; "They Don't Care About Us" (2020 version) on YouTube

Audio sample
- "They Don't Care About Us": file; help

"They Don't Care About Us" is a protest song by the American singer Michael Jackson, released on April 8, 1996, in the UK, and April 23 in the US. It was the fourth single from Jackson's ninth album, HIStory: Past, Present and Future, Book I (1995). The initial release contained ethnic slurs, triggering accusations of antisemitism. Jackson issued an apology, saying the lyrics had been intended to draw attention to social injustice, and then altered future copies.

Two music videos were directed by Spike Lee. The first was shot in Pelourinho, the historic city center of Salvador, and in Santa Marta, a favela of Rio de Janeiro. State authorities tried to ban production over fears the video would damage their image, the area and prospects of Rio de Janeiro staging the 2004 Olympics. Still, the residents of the area were happy to see Jackson, hoping their problems would be made visible to a wider audience. The second video was shot in a prison and contains footage of human rights abuses.

"They Don't Care About Us" became a top-five hit in several European countries, being the continent's ninth highest-selling single and tenth-most radio-played song of 1996 in the continent. It was a top-30 hit on the US Billboard Hot 100, one of few record charts in the world to combine airplay and sales at the time. It also made number 31 on the US Cash Box Top 100. The music video premiere was viewed by over 200 million people worldwide, making it one of the most viewed music videos. Jackson performed "They Don't Care About Us" as part of a medley with "Scream" and "In the Closet" during his third and final concert series, the HIStory World Tour, which ran from 1996 to 1997. The song was set to be performed on Jackson's This Is It comeback concert series July 2009 to March 2010, but the shows were cancelled due to his death in June 2009. In 2011, the Immortal album included a remixed version of "They Don't Care About Us", with elements of the songs "Privacy" (from Invincible) and "Tabloid Junkie" (from HIStory).

== Music and composition ==
The song begins with a group of children singing the chorus, "All I wanna say is that they don't really care about us". In between the chorus lines, one child exclaims, "Don't worry what people say, we know the truth", after which another child shouts, "Enough is enough of this garbage!" It is played in the key of D minor and the track's time signature is common time. The song, which is cited as being a pop song, has a moderately slow tempo of 90 beats per minute. Instruments used include synthesizers, percussion with Olodum and guitar. "They Don't Care About Us" is a pop rock, rap rock, dancehall, blues, and samba-reggae song.

== Critical reception ==
Larry Flick from Billboard magazine noted that the controversial lyrics were obscured by sound effects: "With or without those words, this song comes across as less an intended indictment of the world's oppressive forces and more as lightly shrouded ramblings of personal paranoia. There is nothing wrong with an artist pouring personal experience into a song, of course, but the range of emotion displayed in Jackson's snarling vocal would be far more affecting within a more direct lyrical context." A reviewer from Music Week rated "They Don't Care About Us" four out of five, adding, "With echoes of 'Bad', Jackson's next single from HIStory sees him in tougher mode, with some real raucous guitar backing his soaring vocals." The magazine's Alan Jones described it as "a slim, sylph-like tirade, economical and angry." He concluded, "The quality of the song is there however, and Jacko's on a roll. Number one?" Jim Farber of New York Daily News said that Jackson "snarled" while singing, that the song "clicked" and has an "original clattering rhythm".

Jon Pareles from The New York Times stated that Jackson was calling himself "a victim of police brutality" and a "victim of hate". He continued, "A listener might wonder just who 'Us' is supposed to be ... To make the songs lodge in the ear, Jackson uses elementary singsong melodies – a 'nyah, nyah' two-note motif in 'They Don't Care About Us' ... and he comes up with all kinds of surprises in the arrangements". James Hunter of Rolling Stone magazine noted that, musically, Jackson was no longer trying to hide any eccentricities he had and added that, with "They Don't Care About Us", the pop musician sounded more embattled than ever. The review of HIStory in The Washington Times noted of "They Don't Care About Us": "[it] follows fast, inviting more pathos – and more controversy. With haunting clapping and a police scanner in the background". The Sacramento Bee described it as a "looped reggae-lite dance beat".

== Chart performance ==
"They Don't Care About Us" reached number four on the UK singles chart and stayed on the chart for three months. It reached the top ten of every European country, except in Spain, where it reached number 11 and remained in the chart for just one week. In Austria, Switzerland, France, Belgium and Sweden, it reached the top five and stayed in each country's chart for at least 21 weeks. It reached number one for three weeks in Germany and stayed a full 30 weeks in the survey, marking the longest consecutive chart run of a Michael Jackson song in the German charts. In the US, "They Don't Care About Us" reached number 30 on the Billboard Hot 100, falling short of the record breaking success of the two previous singles, "Scream/Childhood" and "You Are Not Alone". It also reached number 31 on the US Cash Box Top 100 and number ten on the Billboard Hot R&B Singles chart.

== Music videos ==
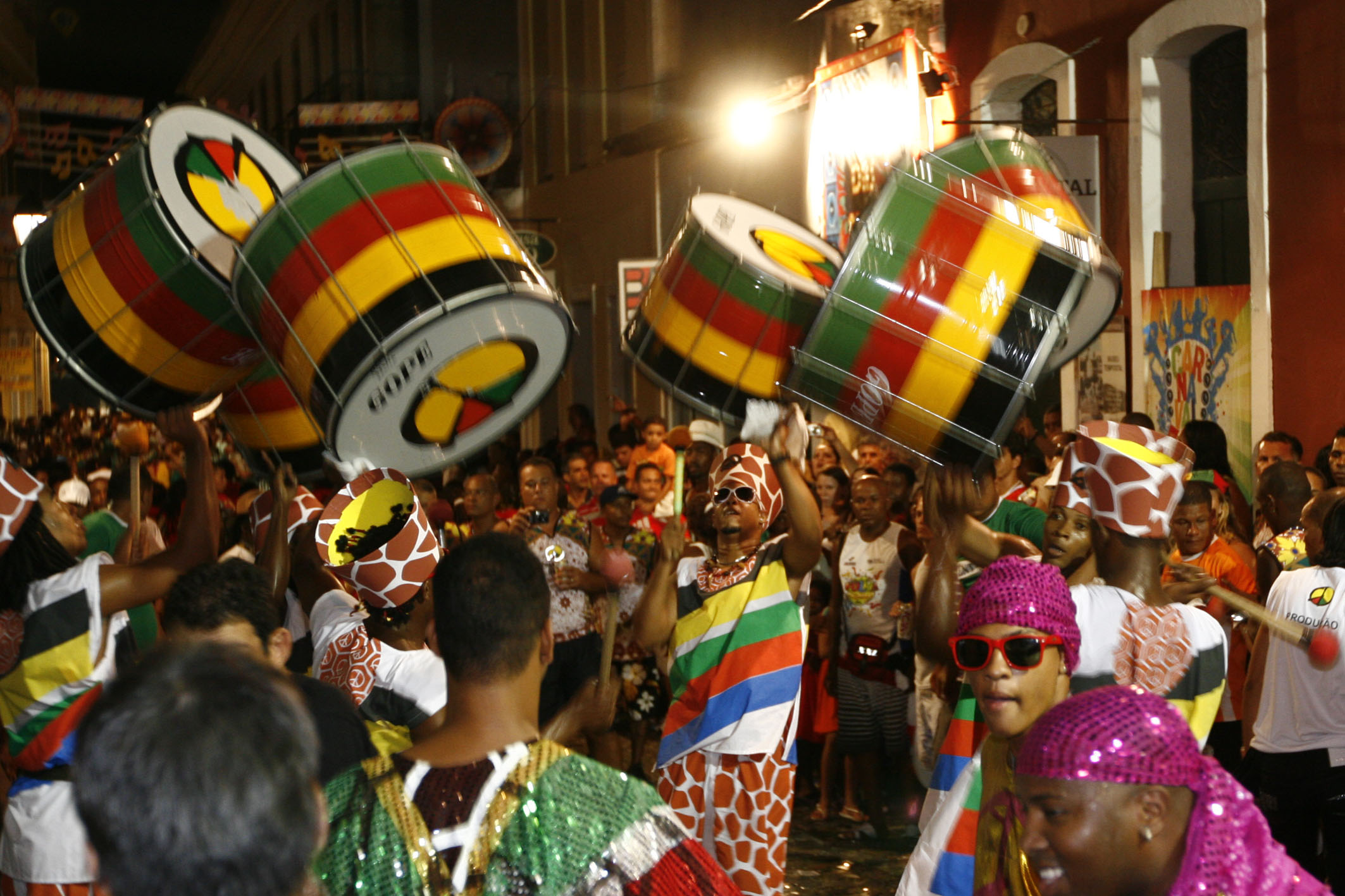
The cultural music group Olodum from the city of Salvador, with whom Jackson collaborated

Producing the first music video in February 1996 for "They Don't Care About Us" proved to be a difficult task for Jackson. State authorities unsuccessfully tried to ban Jackson filming in Salvador (Pelourinho) and in Rio de Janeiro. Officials in the state of Rio feared images of poverty might affect tourism and accused Jackson of exploiting the poor. Ronaldo Cezar Coelho, the state secretary for Industry, Commerce and Tourism, demanded editing rights over the finished product, stating, "I don't see why we should have to facilitate films that will contribute nothing to all our efforts to rehabilitate Rio's image". Some were concerned that scenes of poverty and human rights abuses would affect their chances of hosting the Olympics in 2004. Others supported Jackson's wish to highlight the problems of the region, arguing that the government were embarrassed by their own failings.

A judge banned all filming but this ruling was overturned by an injunction. Although officials were angry, the residents were not and Jackson was surrounded by crowds of enthusiastic onlookers during filming. One woman managed to push through security to hug Jackson who continued dancing while hugging her. Another woman appeared and hugged him from behind, which caused him to fall to the ground; police pulled the two women off him and escorted them back to the crowd. After the director helped Jackson get up off the street, he continued to sing and dance. This incident made it into the music video. 1,500 policemen and 50 residents acting as security guards effectively sealed off the Santa Marta favela. Some residents and officials found it offensive that Jackson's production team had negotiated with drug dealers in order to gain permission to film in one of the city's shantytowns.

== Live performances ==
"They Don't Care About Us" was only performed as part of the opening medley for the HIStory World Tour, along with "Scream" and "In the Closet". The segment for "They Don't Care About Us" began with a short, military-style dance sequence and contained an excerpt of "HIStory". A short unedited video clip released after Jackson's death of the June 23, 2009, rehearsal for the This Is It concert series shows Jackson performing the song as the main song in a medley with parts of "HIStory," as well as "Why You Wanna Trip On Me" and "She Drives Me Wild" from Dangerous. The song was later remixed and featured as part of Cirque du Soleil's Michael Jackson: The Immortal World Tour.

== Accusations of antisemitism ==
On June 15, 1995, a day before the release of HIStory, The New York Times reported that "They Don't Care About Us" contained racist and antisemitic lyrics: "Jew me, sue me, everybody do me / Kick me, kike me, don't you black or white me." Jackson responded:

The idea that these lyrics could be deemed objectionable is extremely hurtful to me, and misleading. The song in fact is about the pain of prejudice and hate and is a way to draw attention to social and political problems. I am the voice of the accused and the attacked. I am the voice of everyone. I am the skinhead, I am the Jew, I am the black man, I am the white man. I am not the one who was attacking. It is about the injustices to young people and how the system can wrongfully accuse them. I am angry and outraged that I could be so misinterpreted.

On the ABC News program Prime Time Live, Jackson said: "It's not antisemitic because I'm not a racist person ... I could never be a racist. I love all races." He said some of his closest employees and friends were Jewish. That day, Jackson received support from his manager and record label, who described the lyrics as "brilliant", that they were about opposition to prejudice and taken out of context.

The following day, Jewish community leaders David A. Lehrer and Rabbi Marvin Hier said that Jackson's attempt to make a song critical of discrimination had backfired. They argued that the lyrics used were unsuitable for a teenage audience that might not understand the song's context and that the song was too ambiguous for some listeners to understand. They accepted that Jackson meant well and suggested that he write an explanation in the album booklet.

On June 17, Jackson issued an apology, and he promised that future copies of the album would include an apology. By this point, two million copies had already been shipped. The next day, in his review of HIStory, Jon Pareles of The New York Times wrote, "In ... 'They Don't Care About Us', he gives the lie to his entire catalogue of brotherhood anthems with a burst of antisemitism." On June 21, Patrick Macdonald of The Seattle Times criticized Jackson: "He may have lived a sheltered life, but there really is no excuse for using terms like 'Jew me' and 'kike' in a pop song, unless you make it clear you are denouncing such terms, and do so in an artful way."

Two days later, Jackson announced that he would return to the studio and alter the lyrics on future copies. He reiterated his acceptance that the song was offensive to some. It was reported that "Jew me" and "Kike me" would be substituted with "do me" and "strike me". However, the words were instead obscured with loud, abstract noises. Later remixes instead use repeated words ("Jew me, sue me" being replaced with "Sue me, sue me"). An apology was included in later issues of the album:

There has been a lot of controversy about my song "They Don't Care About Us". My intention was for this song to say 'no' to racism, antisemitism and stereotyping. Unfortunately, my choice of words may have unintentionally hurt the very people I wanted to stand in solidarity with. I just want you all to know how strongly I am committed to tolerance, peace and love, and I apologize to anyone who might have been hurt.

Spike Lee defended Jackson and argued there was a double standard: "While The New York Times asserted the use of racial slurs in 'They Don't Care About Us', they were silent on other racial slurs in the album. The Notorious B.I.G. says 'nigga' on 'This Time Around', another song on the HIStory album, but it did not attract media attention, as well as, many years before, use in lyrics of word 'nigger' by John Lennon."

== Track listings ==
- Europe CD single
1. "They Don't Care About Us" – 4:43
2. "They Don't Care About Us" (Track Masters Remix) – 4:07
3. "They Don't Care About Us" (Charles' Full Joint Remix) – 4:56
4. "Beat It" (Moby's Sub Mix) – 6:11
- US CD single
1. "They Don't Care About Us" – 4:43
2. "They Don't Care About Us" (Charles' Full Joint Mix) – 4:56
3. "They Don't Care About Us" (Dallas Main Mix) – 5:20
4. "They Don't Care About Us" (Love to Infinity's Walk in the Park Radio Mix) – 4:46
5. "They Don't Care About Us" (Love to Infinity's Classic Paradise Radio Mix) – 4:14
6. "They Don't Care About Us" (Track Masters Radio Edit) – 3:41
7. "Rock with You" (Frankie's Favorite Club Mix) – 7:45
8. "Earth Song" (Hani's Club Experience) – 7:55

== Personnel ==
- Michael Jackson – lead vocals, backing vocals, percussion, keyboards, synthesizers, producer, synthesizer programming, vocal arrangements, rhythm arrangements, string arrangements
- Los Angeles Children's Choir – backing vocals
- Trevor Rabin – guitar
- Slash – additional guitar
- Brad Buxer – percussion, keyboards, synthesizers, synthesizer programming
- Chuck Wild – keyboards, synthesizers, synthesizer programming
- Jeff Bova, Jason Miles – keyboards, synthesizers
- Bruce Swedien – recording engineer, mixing
- Eddie De Lena – assistant recording engineer, mixing
- Matt Forger, Rob Hoffman – assistant recording engineers
- Annette Sander – choral arrangements
- Olodum - percussion (only in the Brazilian version)

== Charts ==
=== Weekly charts ===
Weekly chart performance
Chart (1996)	Peak position
Australia (ARIA)	16
Austria (Ö3 Austria Top 40)	2
Belgium (Ultratop 50 Flanders)	9
Belgium (Ultratop 50 Wallonia)	3
Czech Republic (Rádio Top 100 Oficiální)	1
Denmark (Tracklisten)	3
Estonia (Eesti Top 20)	3
Europe Airplay (European Hit 100)	1
Europe Sales (European Hot 100)	2
Finland (Suomen virallinen lista)	6
France (SNEP)	4
Germany (GfK)	1
Hungary (MAHASZ)	1
Iceland (Íslenski Listinn Topp 40)	20
Ireland (IRMA)	7
Israel (Israeli Singles Chart)	7
Italy (Musica e dischi)	1
Italy Airplay (Music & Media)	2
Netherlands (Dutch Top 40)	4
Netherlands (Single Top 100)	4
New Zealand (Recorded Music NZ)	9
Norway (VG-lista)	6
Poland Airplay (Music & Media)	2
Scottish Singles Sales (Official Charts)	7
Spain (AFYVE)	11
Sweden (Sverigetopplistan)	3
Sweden (Swedish Dance Chart)	6
Switzerland (Schweizer Hitparade)	3
Taiwan (IFPI)	2
UK Singles (Official Charts)	4
UK Hip Hop/R&B (Official Charts)	2
UK Airplay (Music Week)	4
UK Club Chart (Music Week)	28
UK Pop Tip Club Chart (Music Week)	6
US Billboard Hot 100	30
US Dance Club Songs (Billboard)	27
US Hot Dance Music/Maxi-Singles Sales (Billboard)	4
US Hot R&B/Hip-Hop Songs (Billboard)	10
US Rhythmic Airplay (Billboard)	27
US Cash Box Top 100	31

Weekly chart performance
Chart (2006)	Peak position
France (SNEP)	66
Ireland (IRMA)	21
Italy (FIMI)	9
Netherlands (Single Top 100)	38
Spain (Promusicae)	2
UK Singles (OCC)	26

Weekly chart performance
Chart (2009)	Peak position
Australia (ARIA)	18
Austria (Ö3 Austria Top 40)	12
Denmark (Tracklisten)	9
European Hot 100 Singles	19
Finland (Suomen virallinen lista)	19
Germany (Media Control Charts)	12
Hot Canadian Digital Singles	49
Netherlands (Single Top 100)	24
New Zealand (Recorded Music NZ)	15
Norway (VG-lista)	10
Sweden (Sverigetopplistan)	7
Switzerland (Schweizer Hitparade)	4
UK Singles (OCC)	28
US Billboard Hot Digital Songs	64

Weekly chart performance
Chart (2012)	Peak position
France (SNEP)	149

Weekly chart performance
Chart (2026)	Peak position
France (SNEP)	47
Global 200 (Billboard)	57
Greece International (IFPI)	30
Italy (FIMI)	92
Norway (IFPI Norge)	93
Poland (Polish Airplay Top 100)	49
Portugal (AFP)	128
Slovakia Singles Digital (ČNS IFPI)	63
UK Dance (Official Charts)	10

=== Year-end charts ===
Year-end chart performance
Chart (1996)	Position
Australia (ARIA)	71
Austria (Ö3 Austria Top 40)	3
Belgium (Ultratop 50 Flanders)	40
Belgium (Ultratop 50 Wallonia)	21
Europe Airplay (European Hit Radio)	10
Europe Sales (Eurochart Hot 100)	9
France (SNEP)	24
Germany (Media Control)	7
Netherlands (Dutch Top 40)	26
Netherlands (Single Top 100)	44
Sweden (Topplistan)	14
Sweden (Swedish Dance Chart)	22
Switzerland (Schweizer Hitparade)	8
UK Singles (OCC)	52
US Hot R&B Singles (Billboard)	83

=== Decade-end charts ===
Chart (1990–1999)	Rank
Austria (Ö3 Austria Top 40)	12

== Certifications ==
Certifications
Region	Certification	Certified units/sales
Australia (ARIA)	Gold	35,000^{^}
Austria (IFPI Austria)	Gold	25,000^{*}
Belgium (BRMA)	Gold	25,000^{*}
Canada (Music Canada)	Platinum	80,000^{‡}
Denmark (IFPI Danmark)	Platinum	90,000^{‡}
France (SNEP)	Silver	125,000^{*}
Germany (BVMI)	3× Gold	750,000^{^}
Italy (FIMI)	Gold	100,000^{‡}
New Zealand (RMNZ)	2× Platinum	60,000^{‡}
Norway (IFPI Norway)	Gold	
Spain (Promusicae)	Gold	30,000^{‡}
Switzerland (IFPI Switzerland)	Gold	25,000^{^}
United Kingdom (BPI)	Platinum	600,000^{‡}
United States (RIAA)	Gold	500,000^{‡}
Streaming
Greece (IFPI Greece)	Gold	1,000,000^{†}
^{*} Sales figures based on certification alone.^{^} Shipments figures based on certification alone.^{‡} Sales+streaming figures based on certification alone.^{†} Streaming-only figures based on certification alone.

== Release history ==
Release dates and formats
Region	Date	Format(s)	Label(s)	Ref.
United Kingdom	April 8, 1996	CD single; 12-inch EP; 7-inch vinyl	Epic	
United States	April 23, 1996	Rhythmic contemporary; contemporary hit radio	Epic	
Japan	May 29, 1996	Mini-album CD	Epic Japan	
