= D.S. (song) =

Song by Michael Jackson featuring Slash

from the album HIStory: Past, Present and Future, Book I
- Released: June 20, 1995
- Recorded: 1994
- Genre: Hard rock
- Length: 4:49
- Label: Epic
- Songwriter: Michael Jackson
- Producer: Michael Jackson

Licensed audio
- "D.S." on YouTube

Audio sample
- "D.S.": file; help

"D.S." is a song by Michael Jackson, released on his 1995 album HIStory: Past, Present and Future, Book I. It is a hard rock song that conveys themes such as bitterness, mistrust and corruption within law enforcement. It was written, composed and produced by Jackson and includes an instrumental accompaniment and guitar solo by Slash.

The song is a diss track; the lyrics are interpreted as an attack on Santa Barbara County District Attorney Tom Sneddon, whose name is similar to the subject of the song, Dom Sheldon. Sneddon controlled the investigation into Jackson following the 1993 accusations of child sexual abuse against him. Jackson was angered by the allegations, his perception of the frequent mistreatment of people of color by the police and media, and the negative effect on his health.

== Background ==
In 1993, the relationship between Jackson and the press worsened when he was accused of child sexual abuse. Jackson was subject to intense media scrutiny while the criminal investigation took place. As part of the investigation, Jackson agreed to a strip search of his body at Neverland Ranch; the strip search was ordered by Thomas W. Sneddon Jr., the district attorney of Santa Barbara County, California, who led the investigation.

Jackson was not charged and the police closed their investigation citing lack of evidence. With his health improving, Jackson began work on his ninth album, HIStory, in 1994. "D.S.", like several other HIStory tracks, was Jackson's response to recent events in his personal life.

== Composition ==
The song has a rock feel, with a guitar solo performed by Guns N' Roses guitarist Slash, who had previously worked with Jackson on his Dangerous album. In his HIStory album review, Entertainment Weekly's David Browne defines "D.S." as a hard rock song. "D.S." contains an excerpt from the Yes single "Owner of a Lonely Heart".

"D.S." has similar themes to the rest of HIStory. The album's content focuses on the hardships and public struggles Jackson went through just prior to its production. In the new jack swing/funk rock efforts "Scream" and "Tabloid Junkie", along with the R&B ballad "You Are Not Alone", Jackson retaliates against the injustice and isolation he feels, and directs much of his anger at the media. The lyrics describe the subject of the song as a man who wants him "dead or alive" and "really tried to take me down/By surprise". The track ends with the sound of a gunshot.

Originally titled "T.S.", the song is interpreted as a veiled attack on Sneddon. Fox News and CNN observed that, when sung, "Dom S. Sheldon" sounds close to "Thomas Sneddon". The BBC suggested that the lyric's reference to a "B.S.T.A." sounds similar to "S.B.D.A.", meaning "Santa Barbara District Attorney". The Guardian and The New York Times expressed the view that Jackson suggests "Sheldon" has links to the CIA and the Ku Klux Klan and he just "wants your vote". Sneddon's website states that Sneddon is "the only DA in the nation to have an angry song written about him by pop megastar Michael Jackson". Of the song, Sneddon said, "I have not—shall we say—done him the honor of listening to it, but I’ve been told that it ends with the sound of a gunshot".

== Critical reception ==
Although the album HIStory was nominated for the Grammy Award for Album of the Year and had additional related Grammy nominations, hardly any mainstream music reviewers provided a critical analysis of "D.S." in their reviews of the album. Analysis of the song usually only covered the connection to Tom Sneddon and the song's genre. However, Fred Shuster of the Daily News of Los Angeles described "D.S." as a "superb [slice] of organic funk that will fuel many of the summer's busiest dance floors".

== Ghosts ==
Although there was no music video made for "D.S.", the song's subject was referenced in the short film Ghosts. Released in 1996 and premiering at the 1997 Cannes Film Festival, it was written by Jackson and Stephen King and directed by Stan Winston. The story was loosely based on the events and isolation Jackson felt after he was accused of child sexual abuse in 1993.

In the plot, the Maestro (played by Jackson) is nearly chased out of his town by the mayor (also played by Jackson wearing heavy prosthetic makeup to deliberately look very similar to Sneddon) and the residents because they believe him to be a "freak". It features many special effects and dance moves to original music, composed and choreographed by Jackson. The film includes several songs and music videos from the albums HIStory and Blood on the Dance Floor: HIStory in the Mix. The video for Ghosts is over thirty-eight minutes long and previously held the Guinness World Record for the world's longest music video.

== Aftermath ==
The child sexual abuse allegations of 2003 resulted in a long trial two years later. Sneddon was the lead investigator again, as well as the trial prosecutor. The trial ended with Jackson being acquitted on all counts. The two investigations controlled by Sneddon drew complaints that he was motivated by a "vendetta" against Jackson; evidence to support these claims include Sneddon joking about Jackson's greatest hits album being released on the same day as his arrest and sarcastically saying, "Like the sheriff and I really are into that kind of music", calling Jackson "Wacko Jacko" and shouting "we got him, we finally got him" to the media when he had only just begun an investigation and had gathered limited evidence. "D.S." was sung outside the courtroom by a group of Jackson's fans every day the trial took place.

In January 2019, as a response to the controversial Leaving Neverland documentary, Jackson's fans created an unofficial, fan-made version titled "Wade Robson Is a Cold Man" (alternatively titled "W.R."); the lyrics are identical with the exception of "Dom Sheldon" being replaced by "Wade Robson".

== Personnel ==
- Produced and arranged by Michael Jackson
- Recorded and mixed by Bruce Swedien
- Michael Jackson – lead and backing vocals
- Brad Buxer – keyboards and synthesizers
- Chuck Wild – synthesizers
- Slash – guitar
- Trevor Rabin – guitar

== Bibliography ==
- Campbell, Lisa (1995). Michael Jackson: The King of Pops Darkest Hour. Branden. ISBN 0-8283-2003-9.
- George, Nelson (2004). Michael Jackson: The Ultimate Collection booklet. Sony BMG.
- Jones, Jel (2005). Michael Jackson, the King of Pop: The Big Picture: the Music! the Man! the Legend! the Interviews!. Amber Books Publishing. ISBN 0-9749779-0-X.
- Taraborrelli, J. Randy (2004). The Magic and the Madness. Terra Alta, West Virginia: Headline. ISBN 0-330-42005-4.
