= HIStory: Past, Present and Future, Book I =

1995 double album by Michael Jackson

Studio album / greatest hits album by Michael Jackson
- Released: June 20, 1995
- Recorded: December 1978 – October 1991 (disc 1); 1986 ("Come Together"); January 1994 – March 1995 (disc 2)
- Studios: The Hit Factory (New York City); Sony Music (New York City); Record One (Los Angeles); Ocean Way (Hollywood); Larrabee (Hollywood); Westlake (Los Angeles); Hayvenhurst (Encino, California); Flyte Tyme (Minneapolis); Chicago Recording Company (Chicago)
- Genres: Pop; R&B; hip-hop
- Length: 148:41 (total); 71:32 (HIStory Begins); 77:09 (HIStory Continues)
- Labels: MJJ; Epic
- Producers: Michael Jackson; Quincy Jones; Teddy Riley; Jimmy Jam & Terry Lewis; Janet Jackson; Dallas Austin; Bruce Swedien; René Moore; David Foster; Bill Bottrell; R. Kelly

Michael Jackson chronology
Dangerous (1991)	HIStory: Past, Present and Future, Book I (1995)	Blood on the Dance Floor: HIStory in the Mix (1997)

Singles from HIStory: Past, Present and Future, Book I
- 1. "Scream" / "Childhood" Released: May 29, 1995; 2. "You Are Not Alone" Released: July 28, 1995; 3. "Earth Song" Released: November 6, 1995; 4. "They Don't Care About Us" Released: April 8, 1996; 5. "Stranger in Moscow" Released: September 5, 1996

HIStory: Past, Present and Future, Book I, often referred to simply as HIStory, is a double album by the American singer and songwriter Michael Jackson, released on June 20, 1995. It consists of the greatest hits album HIStory Begins and Jackson's ninth studio album, HIStory Continues. It was Jackson's fifth album released through Epic Records and the first on his label, MJJ Productions. HIStory includes appearances by Janet Jackson, Shaquille O'Neal, Slash, and the Notorious B.I.G. Its genres span pop, R&B, and hip hop with elements of hard rock and funk rock. Lyrical themes include environmental awareness, isolation, greed, and injustice.

Several songs pertain to the child sexual abuse allegations made against Jackson in 1993 and Jackson's perceived mistreatment by the media. "They Don't Care About Us" drew controversy over accusations of antisemitism, which Jackson denied. To promote the album, Jackson embarked on the HIStory World Tour, his third and final concert tour as a solo artist. It grossed $165 million, making it the highest-grossing solo concert tour of the 1990s.

HIStory debuted at number 1 on the Billboard 200 and in nineteen other countries. The first single, a double A-side of "Scream" (a duet between Jackson and his sister Janet) and "Childhood", reached the top five of the Billboard Hot 100. "You Are Not Alone" became the first song to debut at number one on the Hot 100 and was Jackson's final US number-one single. "Earth Song" and "They Don't Care About Us", and "Stranger in Moscow" were also released as singles.

HIStory sold more than 20 million copies worldwide, making it one of the best-selling albums of all time, and was certified 8× platinum by the Recording Industry Association of America. It received generally favorable reviews, though it was viewed as a regression from Jackson's previous releases. HIStory was nominated for five Grammy Awards at the 1996 Grammy Awards, including Jackson's third Album of the Year nomination. It won Best Music Video – Short Form for "Scream". Disc one was also re-released as a standalone compilation album titled Greatest Hits: HIStory, Volume I in 2001.

== Background ==
Starting in the late 1980s, Jackson and the tabloid press had a difficult relationship. In 1986, tabloids claimed that Jackson slept in a hyperbaric oxygen chamber and had offered to buy the bones of Joseph Merrick (the "Elephant Man"), both of which Jackson vehemently denied. These stories inspired the derogatory nickname "Wacko Jacko", which Jackson despised. He stopped leaking untruths to the press, and the media began creating their own stories. In 1989, Jackson released "Leave Me Alone", a song about the victimization he felt by the press.

In 1993, the relationship between Jackson and the press collapsed when he was accused of child sexual abuse. Although he was not charged, Jackson was subject to intense media scrutiny while the criminal investigation took place. Media coverage included misleading and sensational headlines; paying for stories of Jackson's alleged criminal activity and confidential material from the police investigation; using unflattering pictures of Jackson; and using headlines that strongly implied Jackson's guilt. In 1993, a Daily Express headline read "Drug Treatment Star Faces Life on the Run", while a News of the World headline accused Jackson of being a fugitive; these tabloids also falsely alleged that Jackson had traveled to Europe to have cosmetic surgery that would make him unrecognizable on his return. The same year, the Daily Mirror held a "Spot the Jacko" contest, offering readers a trip to Disney World if they could correctly predict where Jackson would appear next. In early November 1993, talk show host Geraldo Rivera set up a mock trial with a jury of audience members, though Jackson had not been charged with a crime. In 1994, Jackson said of the media coverage: "I am particularly upset by the handling of the matter by the incredible, terrible mass media. At every opportunity, the media has dissected and manipulated these allegations to reach their own conclusions."

To deal with the stress of allegations and media coverage Jackson began taking painkillers, along with anxiety medications Valium, Xanax and Ativan. A few months after the allegations became news, Jackson stopped eating. Soon after, Jackson's health deteriorated to the extent he canceled the remainder of his Dangerous World Tour and went into rehabilitation. Jackson booked the whole fourth floor of a clinic and was put on Valium IV to wean him from painkillers.

== Content ==
HIStory was Jackson's first studio album since his 1991 album Dangerous and his first new material after being accused of child sexual abuse. The album comprises two discs. The first, HIStory Begins, is a compilation of songs from Jackson's albums Off the Wall (1979), Thriller (1982), Bad (1987) and Dangerous (1991). The second, HIStory Continues, comprises new material recorded from January 1994 to March 1995, although one of the songs (a cover of the Beatles' "Come Together") had been recorded as early as 1986. Jackson co-wrote and co-produced a majority of the new songs; other writers include Jimmy Jam and Terry Lewis, Dallas Austin, the Notorious B.I.G., Bruce Swedien, R. Kelly and René Moore, and other producers include David Foster and Bill Bottrell. Some reviewers commented on the unusual format of a new studio album being accompanied by a "greatest hits" collection, with Q magazine saying "from the new songs' point of view, it's like taking your dad with you into a fight."

"Scream"
Excerpt of the single "Scream". Both siblings' vocals can be heard in the audio sample, with Janet Jackson's vocals first. Critics noted that it was hard to distinguish their voices apart.

"D.S."
Excerpt of the album track "D.S.". In the excerpt Jackson accuses "D.S." of being politically motivated, having a poor social life and a bad childhood upbringing. The song has a distinctive rock edge.

"Tabloid Junkie"
A sample of "Tabloid Junkie". The song's lyrics are about media biases and are aimed at listeners not to believe everything they read from the media and tabloids.

"Earth Song"
Unlike other songs lyrics on HIStory, the lyrics to "Earth Song" pertain to environmental concerns.

Similarly to Thriller and Bad, HIStory contains lyrics that deal with paranoia. Several of the album's 15 new songs pertain to the child sexual abuse allegations made against him in 1993 and Jackson's perceived mistreatment by the media, mainly the tabloids. Two of the album's new tracks are covers. The genres of the songs on the album span R&B, pop, and hip hop with elements of hard rock ("D.S.") and funk rock ("Scream"), and ballads. The lyrics pertain to isolation, greed, environmental concerns, injustice. "Scream" is a duet with Jackson's sister Janet; with "spitting" lyrics about injustice.

The lyrics for the R&B ballad "You Are Not Alone", written by R. Kelly, pertain to isolation. Two Belgian songwriters, brothers Eddy and Danny Van Passel, claimed to have written the melody in 1993. In September 2007, a Belgian judge ruled the song had been plagiarized from the Van Passel brothers, and it was banned from radio play in Belgium. "D.S.", a hard rock song, has lyrics about a "cold man" named "Dom S. Sheldon". Critics interpreted it as an attack on district attorney Thomas Sneddon, who had led the investigations into the allegations against Jackson.

"Money" was interpreted as being directed at Evan Chandler, the father of the boy who accused Jackson of child sexual abuse. The lyrics of "Childhood" pertain to Jackson's childhood. Similar to "Scream", the lyrics to "They Don't Care About Us" pertain to injustice, as well as racism. In "This Time Around", Jackson asserts himself as having been "falsely accused". The song includes a guest rap by the Notorious B.I.G. (a.k.a. Biggie Smalls). "Earth Song" was described as a "slow blues-operatic", and its lyrics pertain to environmental concerns. On HIStory, Jackson covered Charlie Chaplin's "Smile" and the Beatles' "Come Together".

"2 Bad" was influenced by hip-hop, with a sample of Run-DMC's "King of Rock" and another guest rap verse by Shaquille O'Neal. The similarity in lyrics and name have led to some seeing it as a spiritual successor to Jackson's 1987 track, "Bad". "Stranger in Moscow" is a pop ballad that is interspersed with sounds of rain, in which Jackson references a "swift and sudden fall from grace". "Tabloid Junkie" is a hard funk song with lyrics instructing listeners to not believe everything they read in the media and tabloids. The album's title track, "HIStory" contained multiple samples, including Martin Luther King Jr.'s "I Have a Dream" speech. "HIStory" was not released as a single from HIStory, but a remix of the song was included on Blood on the Dance Floor: HIStory in the Mix and released as a single in 1997.

As an introduction for "Little Susie", Jackson used his own variation of "Pie Jesu" from Maurice Duruflé's Requiem. The song's accompanying album artwork resembles the painting "Beautiful Victim" by Gottfried Helnwein, which may have inspired the song. Jackson admired Helnwein's work and had purchased some of his paintings. Helnwein later painted a portrait of Jackson.

== Promotion ==
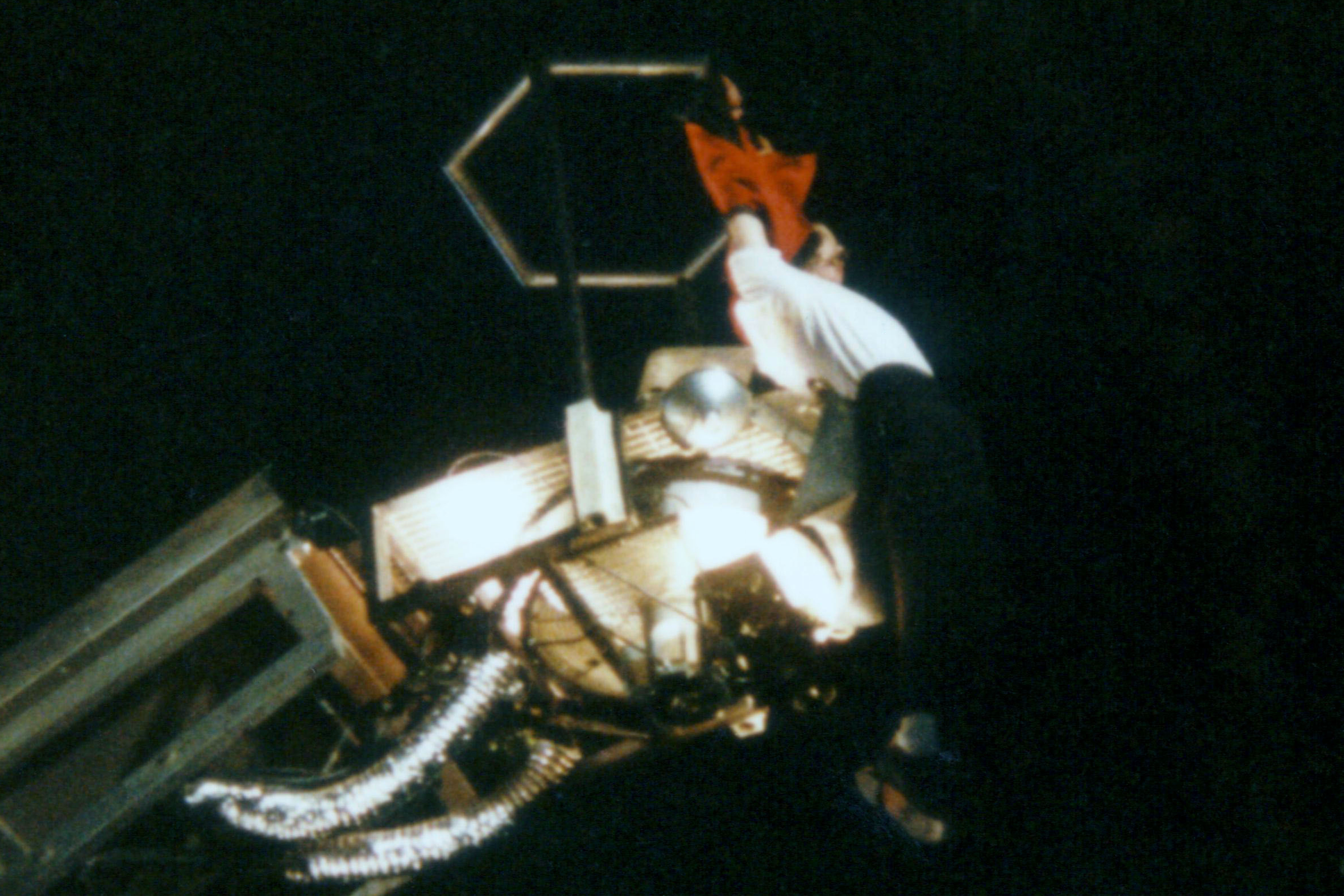
Jackson performing "Earth Song" on June 20, 1997, in Lausanne, Switzerland during the HIStory World Tour. During the performance Jackson was dangled from the edge of a crane.

Sony Music spent $30 million to promote the album, one of the most expensive promotional campaigns ever for an album. They expected the album to generate eight or more singles and sell 20 million copies worldwide. HIStory was concurrently released in six formats: vinyl record, compact disc, cassette, VHS, laser disc, and MiniDisc. The music press were anticipating how well it would sell. One analyst for SoundScan expressed the opinion that the press was out of touch with the public when it came to Jackson; the public liked him, while the press did not. He believed that "naysayers" in the media would be left surprised with the commercial reception.

During this period of time, Jackson made a series of public appearances, becoming the first time that he faced the public eye following the allegations. On June 14, 1995, Jackson was interviewed with his then wife Lisa Marie Presley by Diane Sawyer for a television special. It was watched by 60 million in the United States and 500 million worldwide, but received mixed reviews from critics. On September 7, 1995, he opened the MTV Video Music Awards with a 15 minute long medley. Jackson had intended to further promote the project through the release of a two-hour televised concert special on HBO titled Michael Jackson: The King of Pop – One Night Only, which was scheduled to have been filmed across two days beginning on December 8, 1995 at the Beacon Theatre in New York City, and aired on December 10. Jackson was hospitalized on December 6 after falling ill during rehearsals, and the special was postponed and ultimately canceled. The hospitalization also forced him to cancel a planned appearance at the 1995 Billboard Music Awards.

To promote the album, Jackson embarked on the HIStory World Tour, which grossed $165 million (equivalent to $268 million in 2019). It was Jackson's third and final concert tour as a solo artist. The tour, beginning in Prague, Czech Republic on September 7, 1996, attracted more than 4.5 million fans from 58 cities in 35 countries around the world. The average concert attendance was 54,878 and the tour lasted 82 tour dates. Jackson performed no concerts in the United States, besides two concerts in January 1997 in Hawaii at the Aloha Stadium, to a crowd of 35,000 each; he was the first artist to sell out the stadium. VIP seats cost, on average, $200 per person. Each concert lasted an estimated two hours and ten minutes. The tour concluded in Durban, South Africa on October 15, 1997.

The album cover depicts a 10-foot sculpture of Jackson in a "warrior-like" pose, created in 1994 by Diana Walczak. To promote the tour, Epic placed ten 30-foot replicas of the statue in locations around the world, including the River Thames in London, Alexanderplatz in Berlin, Eindhoven in the Netherlands, and the pedestal of the destroyed Stalin Monument in Prague. The statues were built over three months by a team of 30, made from steel and fiberglass, and weighed around 20,000 pounds each. Another statue, built from wood and plaster, was placed at the Los Angeles Tower Records store. In 2016, the original statue was installed at the Mandalay Bay casino in Las Vegas.

== Singles ==
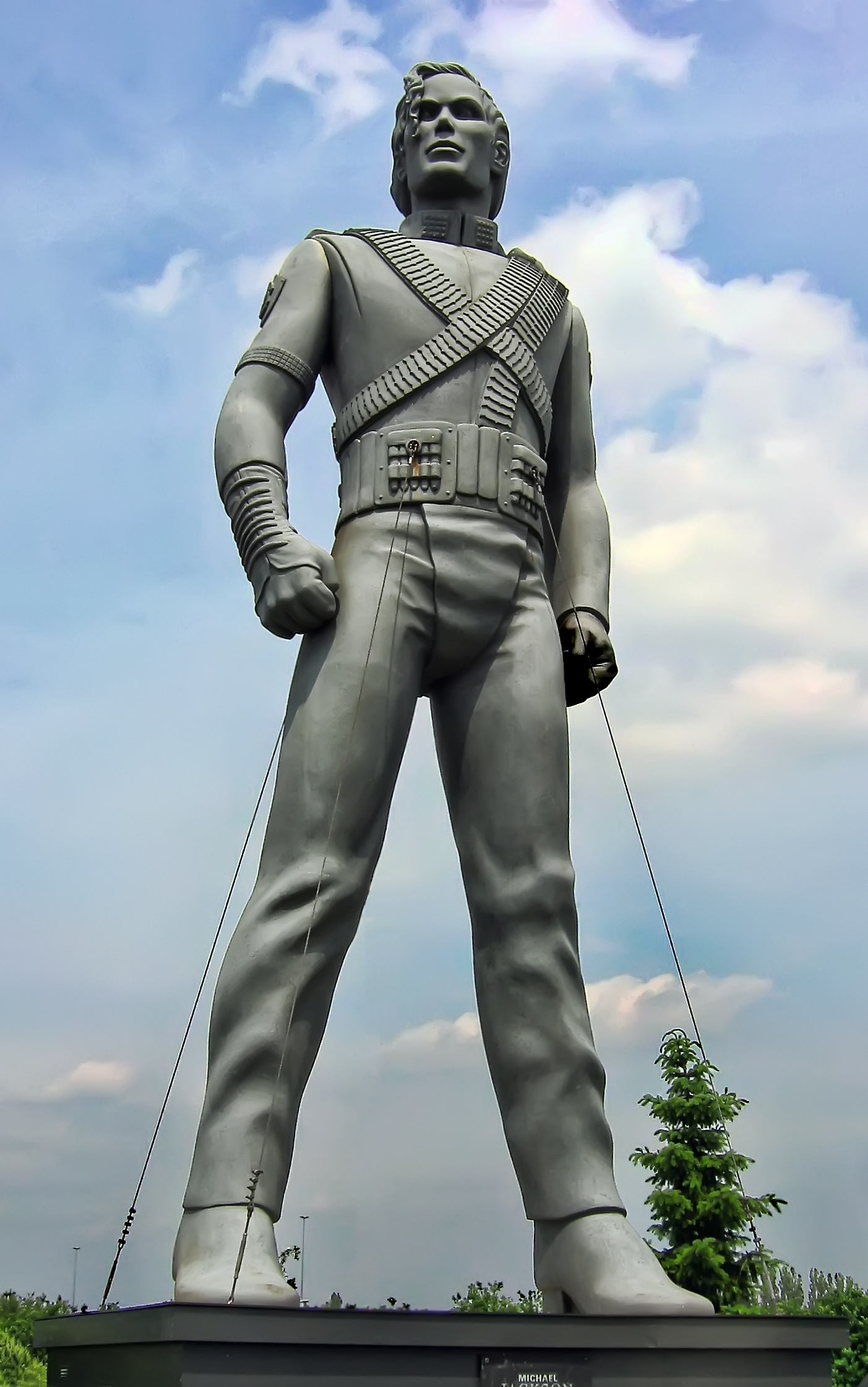
One of several 30-foot statues placed around Europe to promote the HIStory World Tour—the accompanying tour for Michael Jackson's HIStory (1995)

Five singles were released from HIStory. "Scream"/"Childhood" was the first single released in May 1995. "Scream" was sung and performed by Jackson and his sister Janet Jackson. The single had the best ever debut at number five—where it peaked, on the Billboard Hot 100. The song received a Grammy nomination for "Best Pop Collaboration with Vocals". The music video for "Scream" is one of Jackson's most critically acclaimed videos, receiving numerous awards. With a US$9 million music video production budget, "Scream" is the most expensive music video ever made as of 2025.

"You Are Not Alone" was the second single released from HIStory. Having debuted at number one on the Billboard Hot 100 on September 2, 1995, it became the first song to debut at number one on the chart, succeeding the record previously held from Jackson's "Scream" single. "You Are Not Alone" was released in August 1995, and it topped the charts in various international markets, including the United Kingdom, France, and Spain. The song was seen as a major artistic and commercial success.

"Earth Song" was the third single released in November 1995. "Earth Song" did not chart on Billboard 100. Internationally, the song topped four countries' charts, as well as charting within the top-ten in nine other nations. The song topped the UK Singles Chart for six weeks over Christmas in 1995 and sold one million copies there, making it his most successful United Kingdom single, surpassing the success of "Billie Jean".

"They Don't Care About Us" was the fourth single. "They Don't Care About Us" peaked at number thirty on the Billboard 100, and it charted within the top-ten of Billboard's Hot Dance Music and Hot R&B Singles Charts. The song charted better in other countries compared to the United States, managing to chart within the top-ten in fourteen countries. "They Don't Care About Us" topped the German Singles chart for three weeks, while peaking at number two in Spain, number three in Austria, Sweden, and Switzerland, as well as charting at number four in France, the United Kingdom and the Netherlands.

"Stranger in Moscow" was released as the fifth and final single in November 1996. The song was well received by critics. In the United States, the song peaked at number ninety one on the Billboard Hot 100. Outside of the United States, the song was a success, topping in Spain and Italy, while peaking within the top-ten in the United Kingdom, Switzerland, and New Zealand, among others.

"This Time Around" was released to contemporary hit radio as a promotional single in the United States on November 21, 1995. The song has a guest rap by the Notorious B.I.G. The December 1995 HBO special One Night Only was heavily marketed on releases of this promo, but the special was canceled after Jackson had fallen ill. Several official remixes of "This Time Around" were commissioned; one of these remixes by David Morales later appeared on Blood on the Dance Floor: HIStory in the Mix (1997). The song peaked at number 23 on the Billboard Hot R&B Singles chart and at number 18 on the Billboard Hot Dance Music/Club Play chart.

"Smile" was released as a promotional single, although it was originally intended to be the album's final single, and was to be released in CD and 12" format on December 28, 1997. However, the release was canceled, with only a few promotional copies sent out for airplay. "Smile" did not chart on any music charts worldwide until 2009.

== Music videos ==
HIStory's music videos displayed different themes and elements, while some of them encouraged awareness of poverty and had a positive effect on their shooting locations. The promo video for "They Don't Care About Us" was directed by Spike Lee; Jackson said that Lee chose to direct the video because the song "has an edge, and Spike Lee had approached me. It's a public awareness song and that's what he is all about. It's a protest kind of song... and I think he was perfect for it." Jackson also collaborated with 200 members of the cultural group Olodum, who played music in the video. The resulting media interest exposed Olodum to 140 countries, bringing them worldwide fame and increasing their status in Brazil. Lúcia Nagib, of The New Brazilian Cinema, said of the music video:

"When Michael Jackson decided to shoot his new music video in a favela of Rio de Janeiro... he used the favela people as extras in a visual super-spectacle... All the while there is a vaguely political appeal in there... The interesting aspect of Michael Jackson's strategy is the efficiency with which it gives visibility to poverty and social problems in countries like Brazil without resorting to traditional political discourse. The problematic aspect is that it does not entail a real intervention in that poverty."

In 2009, Billboard described the area as "now a model for social development" and stated that Jackson's influence was partially responsible for this improvement. For the first time in Jackson's career, he made a second music video for a single. This second version was filmed in a prison with cellmates; the video shows Jackson handcuffed and contains real footage of police attacking African Americans, the Ku Klux Klan, genocide, execution, and other human rights abuses. Jackson's music video for "Earth Song" received praise for its environmental recognition. In 1995, the video received a Genesis Award for Doris Day Music Award, given each year for animal sensitivity. In 2008, a writer for the Nigeria Exchange said that "'Earth Song' drew the world's attention to the degradation and bastardization of the earth as a fall out of various human activities".

Two other music videos from HIStory have been influential. Jackson's "Stranger In Moscow" music video influenced the advertising campaign for International Cricket Council Champions Trophy 2004, which featured "a series of smart outdoor ads and a classy TV spot". The television commercial was inspired by "Stranger In Moscow"s video where "the maiden in black splash about in the rain, with kids playing cricket for company". "Scream" was a creative influence on other music videos such as "No Scrubs" (1999) by TLC. This influence was also present on the 2008 release of "Shawty Get Loose" by rapper Lil Mama.

== Commercial performance ==
HIStory debuted at number one on the Billboard 200 and Top R&B/Hip-Hop Albums charts selling over 391,000 copies in its first week. In its second week, the album stayed at the top with 263,000 copies sold, a decline of 33%.In its third week, the album slipped to number two with 142,000 copies sold, a 46% decline, and to number four the following week with 105,000 copies.However, the album spent just six weeks at the top 10, selling over one million copies in total. Controversy with the album came with Jackson having to rerecord some lyrics in "They Don't Care About Us" after he was accused of antisemitism, and contributor R. Kelly was accused of having plagiarized one of the album's songs, "You Are Not Alone", leading to its banning on Belgian radio.

According to SoundScan by March 1998, the album had sold more than 2.2 million units. According to SoundScan, the set fell short of many observers' expectations. The album has further sold 730,000 copies through BMG music club as of February 2003. The album was certified eight times platinum by the Recording Industry Association of America (RIAA) on August 23, 2018, in the United States. Because HIStory is a double disc album, its CDs are therefore counted separately for certification purposes, meaning the album achieved platinum status in the United States after 500,000 copies were shipped, not one million.

However, the album was a massive success in other countries. In Europe, before it was released, three million copies were shipped, breaking records as the most shipped album ever. The International Federation of the Phonographic Industry certified HIStory six times platinum, denoting six million shipments within the continent, including 1.5 million in Germany and 1.2 million shipments in the United Kingdom. In the United Kingdom, the album debuted at number one and sold 100,000 copies in just two days. It was certified 4× platinum by the BPI. Eventually, it sold 1.6 million copies. In Australia, an advance order of 130,000 copies was the largest initial shipment in Sony Australia's history. In its first two days of release, HIStory sold 30,000 units in Spain and 75,000 units in Italy. In Spain, HIStory was the 20th best-selling album of 1995 and the 12th best selling album by a foreign artist. In Chile, the album topped the charts and broke all sales records in the country when it sold 25,000 units within 72 hours of its release on June 16. In Colombia, 150,000 copies (300,000 equivalent units) were shipped. In Canada, retailers ordered 400,000 copies of History in advance of its release. The album subsequently debuted at number one on the Canadian Albums Chart. By November 1996, HIStory reached 11 million copies sold worldwide. According to Sony, the album was shipping as many as 100,000 copies weekly by the end of 1996.

HIStory: Past, Present and Future, Book I has sold over 20 million copies worldwide, making it simultaneously one of the best-selling multiple-disc releases and one of the best-selling albums of all time. The greatest hits disc was reissued as a single disc on November 13, 2001, under the title Greatest Hits: HIStory, Volume I and had sold four million copies worldwide by 2010. The second disc was released separately in some European countries in 2011.

== Critical reception ==
Professional ratings
Review scores
Source	Rating
Entertainment Weekly	B
News & Record	3.5/5 stars
Q	3/5 stars
Rolling Stone	4/5 stars
Smash Hits	5/5 stars
The News-Journal	3/5 stars
The Orlando Sentinel	2/5 stars

Retrospective ratings
Review scores
Source	Rating
AllMusic	3/5 stars
Christgau's Consumer Guide	(2-star Honorable Mention)
The Rolling Stone Album Guide	3/5 stars
MusicHound Rock	4/5 stars

HIStory received generally favorable reviews by critics. In a glowing review, Jon Pareles of The New York Times praises HIStory Continues as "meticulous, sumptuous, [and] musically ingenious". James Hunter of Rolling Stone gave HIStory four-out-of-five stars and found that it "unfolds in Jackson's outraged response to everything he has encountered in the last year or so." He described "This Time Around" as a "dynamite jam" that was "ripe for remixes", and "Scream" and "Tabloid Junkie" as "adventurous". According to Hunter, "Earth Song" had "noble sentiments" and sounded "primarily like a showpiece". However, Hunter felt HIStory Continues was an "odd, charmless second chapter" compared to Jackson's earlier hits. Fred Shuster of the Daily News of Los Angeles described "This Time Around", "Money" and "D.S." as "superb slices of organic funk that will fuel many of the summer's busiest dance floors". Chris Willman of the Los Angeles Times also highlighted "This Time Around" as "a tough, rhythm-guitar-driven track" that is one of the album's standout songs.

Jim Farber of the New York Daily News gave the album a mixed review, criticising the new material for having too many melodies and arrangements that sound like "shuffled versions" of songs off Jackson's previous three albums. Stephen Thomas Erlewine of AllMusic gave HIStory three-out-of-five stars, commenting that it was a "monumental achievement" of Jackson's ego. Erlewine remarked that on the HIStory Begins CD, it contains "some of the greatest music in pop history" but that it leaves some hits out, citing "Say Say Say" and "Dirty Diana" — commenting that "yet it's filled with enough prime material to be thoroughly intoxicating". Erlewine noted that HIStory Continues is "easily the most personal album Jackson has recorded" and that its songs' lyrics referencing the molestation accusations create a "thick atmosphere of paranoia". He cited "You Are Not Alone" and "Scream" as being "well-crafted pop that ranks with his best material", but concludes that "nevertheless, HIStory Continues stands as his weakest album since the mid-'70s." David Browne of Entertainment Weekly, gave "HIStory Begins" an "A−" grade but the album's new material a "C−", which "winds up a B" for the entire album. Browne commented that the music "rarely seems to transport him (and thereby us) to a higher plane."

=== Awards ===
HIStory was nominated for six Grammy Awards at the 1996 and 1997 ceremonies respectively, winning one award. "You Are Not Alone" was nominated for Best Pop Vocal Performance – Male and for Song of the Year. "Scream" was nominated for Best Pop Collaboration with Vocals and "Scream" won Best Music Video - Short Form and "Earth Song" was nominated for the same award the following year. The album itself was nominated for Album of the Year. At the 1995 MTV Video Music Awards, "Scream" received ten nominations, winning in three categories. In 1998, the album was ranked at number 96 in BBC's Music of the Millennium, a list of 100 albums chosen by Channel 4 viewers, The Guardian readers and HMV customers as the best of the millennium.

== Controversy ==
=== Accusations of antisemitism ===
On June 15, 1995, The New York Times said that "They Don't Care About Us" contained antisemitic slurs in the lines "Jew me, sue me, everybody do me / Kick me, kike me, don't you black or white me". In a statement, Jackson responded:

The idea that these lyrics could be deemed objectionable is extremely hurtful to me, and misleading. The song, in fact, is about the pain of prejudice and hate and is a way to draw attention to social and political problems. I am the voice of the accused and the attacked. I am the voice of everyone. I am the skinhead, I am the Jew, I am the black man, I am the white man. I am not the one who was attacking. It is about the injustices to young people and how the system can wrongfully accuse them. I am angry and outraged that I could be so misinterpreted.

Jackson's manager and record label said the lyrics opposed prejudice and had been taken out of context. The following day, David A. Lehrer and Rabbi Marvin Hier, leaders of two Jewish organizations, stated that Jackson's attempt to make a song critical of discrimination had backfired. They felt the lyrics might be ambiguous and were unsuitable for young audiences because they might not understand the song's context. They acknowledged that Jackson meant well and suggested that he write an explanation in the album booklet. In his review of HIStory, Jon Pareles of The New York Times wrote that the song "gives the lie to his entire catalogue of brotherhood anthems with a burst of anti-Semitism".

On June 17, Jackson promised that future copies of the album would include an apology. On June 23, Jackson announced that he would alter the offending wording on future copies of the album. He reiterated his acceptance that the song was offensive to some. It was reported that "Jew me" and "Kike me" would be substituted with "do me" and "strike me", however, the offending words were instead covered up with loud, abstract noises drowning them out. Remixes of the song that were later released instead use repeated words ("Jew me, sue me" being replaced with "Sue me, sue me"). An apology was included in later issues of the album:

There has been a lot of controversy about my song, "They Don't Care About Us". My intention was for this song to say "No" to racism, anti-Semitism and stereotyping. Unfortunately, my choice of words may have unintentionally hurt the very people I wanted to stand in solidarity with. I just want you all to know how strongly I am committed to tolerance, peace and love, and I apologize to anyone who might have been hurt.

— Michael Jackson

Spike Lee defended Jackson's use of the word, by mentioning the double standard from the media. "While The New York Times asserted the use of racial slurs in 'They Don't Care About Us', they were silent on other racial slurs in the album. The Notorious B.I.G. says 'nigga' on 'This Time Around', another song on the HIStory album, but it did not attract media attention, as well as, many years before, use in lyrics of word 'nigger' by John Lennon."

== Track listing ==
=== HIStory Begins ===
All tracks are written by Michael Jackson, except where noted.

Disc one
No.	Title	Writer(s)	Producer(s)	Length
1.	"Billie Jean" (from Thriller, 1982)		Quincy Jones; M. Jackson^{[a]}	4:54
2.	"The Way You Make Me Feel" (album version from Bad, 1987)		Jones; M. Jackson^{[a]}	4:57
3.	"Black or White" (from Dangerous, 1991)	M. Jackson; Bill Bottrell	M. Jackson; Bottrell	4:15
4.	"Rock with You" (album version from Off the Wall, 1979)	Rod Temperton	Jones	3:40
5.	"She's Out of My Life" (from Off the Wall)	Tom Bahler	Jones	3:37
6.	"Bad" (from Bad)		Jones; M. Jackson^{[a]}	4:07
7.	"I Just Can't Stop Loving You" (7" edit) (from Bad)		Jones; M. Jackson^{[a]}	4:11
8.	"Man in the Mirror" (from Bad)	Siedah Garrett; Glen Ballard	Jones; M. Jackson^{[a]}	5:19
9.	"Thriller" (from Thriller)	Temperton	Jones	5:57
10.	"Beat It" (from Thriller)		Jones; M. Jackson^{[a]}	4:18
11.	"The Girl Is Mine" (duet with Paul McCartney) (from Thriller)		Jones; M. Jackson^{[a]}	3:41
12.	"Remember the Time" (from Dangerous)	Teddy Riley; M. Jackson; Bernard Belle	M. Jackson; Riley	3:59
13.	"Don't Stop 'Til You Get Enough" (from Off the Wall)		Jones; M. Jackson^{[a]}	6:04
14.	"Wanna Be Startin' Somethin'" (from Thriller)		Jones; M. Jackson^{[a]}	6:02
15.	"Heal the World" (from Dangerous)		M. Jackson; Bruce Swedien^{[a]}	6:25
Total length:				71:32

=== HIStory Continues ===
Disc two
No.	Title	Writer(s)	Producer(s)	Length
1.	"Scream" (with Janet Jackson)	James Harris III; Terry Lewis; M. Jackson; J. Jackson	Jimmy Jam; Lewis; M. Jackson; J. Jackson	4:38
2.	"They Don't Care About Us"		M. Jackson	4:44
3.	"Stranger in Moscow"		M. Jackson	5:44
4.	"This Time Around"	M. Jackson; Dallas Austin; Swedien; Rene; Christopher Wallace	Austin; M. Jackson; Swedien^{[a]}; Rene^{[a]}	4:21
5.	"Earth Song"		M. Jackson; David Foster; Bottrell^{[a]}	6:46
6.	"D.S."		M. Jackson	4:49
7.	"Money"		M. Jackson	4:41
8.	"Come Together"	Lennon–McCartney	M. Jackson; Bottrell	4:02
9.	"You Are Not Alone"	R. Kelly	Kelly; M. Jackson	5:45
10.	"Childhood"		M. Jackson; Foster	4:27
11.	"Tabloid Junkie"	M. Jackson; Harris III; Lewis	M. Jackson; Jimmy Jam; Lewis	4:32
12.	"2 Bad"	M. Jackson; Swedien; Rene; Austin	M. Jackson; Jimmy Jam; Lewis; Swedien; Rene	4:49
13.	"HIStory"	M. Jackson; Harris III; Lewis	M. Jackson; Jimmy Jam; Lewis	6:37
14.	"Little Susie"		M. Jackson	6:13
15.	"Smile"	John Turner; Geoffrey Parsons; Charlie Chaplin	Foster; M. Jackson	4:55
Total length:				77:09

Notes

- ^{^[a]} signifies a co-producer
- The songs "Human Nature", "P.Y.T. (Pretty Young Thing)", "Smooth Criminal", "Man in the Mirror", "Dirty Diana", "Another Part of Me", "In the Closet", "Jam" and "Will You Be There" was originally to be included in disc 1 "HIStory Begins", but it was completely cut and removed on the disc 1.
- Three songs contain uncredited guest appearances. "Black or White" features L.T.B., "This Time Around" features The Notorious B.I.G., and "2 Bad" features Shaquille O'Neal.
- Early CD pressings of German, French and Dutch editions of the album contain a special voice message recorded by Jackson to address gratitude towards fans as a hidden track. The message recorded for German market is also available on a rare "Scream" single.
- Reissues of the album contain several changes when compared to the original 1995 US release:
  - "They Don't Care About Us" – "Jew me" and "Kike me" would be drowned out by loud, electronic noises in most re-releases of the song, including later pressings of the album, single version and two video versions.
  - "HIStory" – original musical compositions sampled include "Beethoven Lives Upstairs" and "The Great Gate of Kiev" from Pictures at an Exhibition, but in reissues of the album, the Pictures at an Exhibition piece was replaced by a similar improvised orchestra piece.

== Personnel ==
Adapted from the album's liner notes and AllMusic.

- Michael Jackson – arranger, director, drums, executive producer, guitar, horn arrangements, keyboard arrangements, keyboards, liner notes, percussion, primary artist, producer, rhythm arrangements, sequencing arranger, string arrangements, synthesizer, synthesizer arrangements, vocal arrangements, vocals, background vocals
- Gary Adante – keyboards, synthesizer
- Yannick Allain – staff
- Trini Alvarez Jr. – assistant engineer
- Maxi Anderson – choir conductor
- Rob Arbitter – keyboards, synthesizer
- Ryan Arnold – assistant engineer
- Gloria Augustus – background vocals
- Dallas Austin – arranger, keyboards, producer, synthesizer
- John Bahler – vocal arrangement, background vocals
- John Bahler Singers – background vocals
- Tom Bahler – synclavier
- Bettye Bailey – staff
- Glen Ballard – keyboards, rhythm arrangements, synthesizer, synthesizer arrangements
- Brian Banks – keyboards, synthesizer, synthesizer programming
- John Barnes (American musician) – keyboards, piano, synthesizer, vocal arrangement
- Elmer Bernstein – conductor, orchestral arrangements
- Emily Bernstein – orchestration
- Tony Duino Black – assistant engineer
- Michael Boddicker – choir conductor, keyboards, programming, sound design, synthesizer, synthesizer programming
- Bill Bottrell – drums, engineer, guitar, keyboards, mixing, percussion, producer, synthesizer
- Jeff Bova – programming, synthesizer programming
- Crystal Bowers – executive assistant
- Boyz II Men – guest artist, background vocals
- Miko Brando – staff
- Bobby Brooks – drums, engineer, percussion, programming, sound design, synthesizer programming
- Ollie E. Brown – percussion
- Chauna Bryant – children's chorus, choir/chorus
- Rodger Bumpass – background vocals, voiceover
- Brad Buxer – arranger, keyboards, orchestration, percussion, piano, programming, sequencing arranger, sound effects, soundscape, synthesizer, synthesizer programming
- Caleena Campbell – children's chorus, choir/chorus
- Bruce Cannon – effects, special effects
- Larry Carlton – guitar
- Reeve Carney – children's chorus, choir/chorus
- Reagans Carter – artwork, photography
- Lafayette Carthon – keyboards, synthesizer
- Jim Champagne – assistant engineer
- Leon "Ndugu" Chancler – drums
- Charlie Chaplin – tributee
- Rosemary Chavira – staff
- Wayne Cobham – synthesizer programming
- Lester Cohen – artwork, photography
- David Coleman – art direction
- Funkmaster Flex – turntables
- Jesse Corti – background vocals, voiceover
- Richard Cottrell – engineer
- Andraé Crouch – vocal arrangement, background vocals
- The Andraé Crouch Singers – background vocals
- Sandra Crouch – background vocals
- Christopher Currell – guitar, percussion, rhythm arrangements, synclavier
- Paulinho Da Costa – percussion
- Rick Dasher – assistant engineer
- Eddie DeLena – engineer, mixing
- Jeff DeMorris – assistant engineer
- Carol Dennis – background vocals
- Carolyn Dennis – background vocals
- Nancy Donald – art direction
- Nathan East – bass
- Sheila E. – percussion
- Bill Easystone – assistant engineer
- Felipe Elgueta – engineer
- Sam Emerson – artwork, photography
- Jonathan Exley – artwork, photography
- Ashley Farrell – voiceover
- Steve Ferrone – drums, percussion
- Angela Fisher – children's chorus, choir/chorus
- Matt Forger – engineer, sound effects, soundscape, technical director
- David Foster – keyboards, orchestral arrangements, piano, producer, synthesizer, synthesizer arrangements
- Jania Foxworth – children's chorus, choir/chorus
- Simon Franglen – drums, keyboards, percussion, programming, synclavier programming, synthesizer, synthesizer programming
- Leah Frazier – soloist
- Harrison Funk – artwork, photography
- Eric Gale – guitar
- Gus Garces – assistant engineer
- Siedah Garrett – duet, guest artist, performer, primary artist, vocal harmony
- Humberto Gatica – engineer
- Peter Germansen – assistant engineer
- Douglas Getschall – drum programming, programming
- Kevin Gilbert – engineer, synthesizer programming
- Jim Gilstrap – background vocals
- Nate Giorgio – artwork, photography
- Carl Glanville – assistant engineer
- Greg Gorman – artwork, photography
- Jackie Gouché – background vocals
- Geoff Grace – orchestration
- Crystal Grant – children's chorus
- Gary Grant – flugelhorn, horn, trumpet
- Nikisha Grier – children's chorus, choir/chorus
- Doug Grigsby – bass
- Bernie Grundman – mastering
- Stephanie Gylden – assistant engineer
- Omar Hakim – drums, percussion
- Natalia Harris – children's chorus
- Amy Hartman – staff
- Gary Hearne – staff
- Richard Heath – percussion
- Gorrfried Helnwein – artwork, photography
- Marlo Henderson – guitar
- Jerry Hey – conductor, flugelhorn, horn, horn arrangements, string arrangements, synthesizer arrangements, trumpet
- Steve Hodge – engineer, mixing
- Rob Hoffman – assistant engineer, engineer, guitar, programming, synthesizer programming
- Jean Marie Horvat – Engineer
- Rhonda Hoskins – children's chorus
- How Now Brown Cow – percussion
- Dann Huff – guitar
- Bunny Hull – background vocals
- Kim Hutchcroft – flute, horn, saxophone
- James Ingram – background vocals
- Crystal Jackson – children's chorus, choir/chorus
- Janet Jackson – duet vocals, producer, vocal arrangement, background vocals
- Paul Jackson Jr. – guitar
- Randy Jackson – percussion
- Terry Jackson – bass
- Jimmy Jam – arranger, drum programming, drums, keyboards, percussion, producer, programming, synthesizer, synthesizer bass, synthesizer programming, vocal arrangement
- Mortonette Jenkins – background vocals
- Augie Johnson – background vocals
- Craig Johnson – assistant technical director, engineer, technical director
- Kandy Johnson – children's chorus, choir/chorus
- Kimberly Johnson – children's chorus, choir/chorus
- Louis Johnson – bass
- Marcus Johnson – staff
- Brian Jones – children's chorus, choir/chorus
- Caryn Jones – children's chorus
- Quincy Jones – producer, rhythm arrangements, synthesizer arrangements, vocal arrangement
- Nathan Kaproff – orchestral coordinator
- Suzie Katayama – conductor
- R. Kelly – arranger, keyboards, producer, synthesizer, background vocals
- Jacqueline Kennedy – liner notes
- Randy Kerber – keyboards, synthesizer
- Donn Landee – engineer
- Christa Larson – background vocals
- Julie Last – assistant engineer
- Annie Leibovitz – artwork, photography
- Jen Leigh – guitar
- Jesse Levy – orchestral coordinator
- Terry Lewis – arranger, drum programming, drums, keyboards, percussion, producer, programming, synthesizer, synthesizer bass, synthesizer programming, vocal arrangement
- Becky Lopez – background vocals
- Bryan Loren – drums, percussion, synthesizer bass, background vocals
- Ron Lowe – assistant engineer
- L.T.B. – rap, voiceover
- Jeremy Lubbock – arranger, conductor
- Steve Lukather – bass, guitar
- Jonathan Mackey – piano
- Brian Malouf – engineer
- Johnny Mandel – arranger, string arrangements
- Gregg Mangiafico – programming, synthesizer programming
- Maurice LaMarche – voiceover
- Glen Marchese – assistant engineer
- Anthony Marinelli – synthesizer programming
- Gregory Martin – background vocals, voiceover
- Jasun Martz – keyboards, synthesizer
- Harry Maslin – engineer
- Anna Mathias – background vocals, voiceover
- Coi Mattison – children's chorus
- Paul McCartney – duet vocals, vocal harmony
- Michael McCary – background vocals
- Linda McCrary – background vocals
- Andres McKenzie – voiceover
- Dawn McMillan – voiceover
- Paulette McWilliams – background vocals
- Daniel Medvedev – narrator
- Jason Miles – programming, synthesizer programming
- Jeff Mirinov – guitar
- Peter Mokran – drum programming, engineer, programming, synthesizer programming
- Nathan Morris – background vocals
- Wanya Morris – background vocals
- Wayne Nagin – staff
- Carl Nappa – assistant engineer
- David Nordahl – artwork, photography
- The Notorious B.I.G. – guest artist, rap
- David Nottingham – assistant engineer
- Shaquille O'Neal – guest artist, rap
- Gary Olazabal – engineer
- Claudio Ordenes – engineer
- David Paich – bass, keyboards, piano, rhythm arrangements, synthesizer, synthesizer arrangements
- Marty Paich – conductor, orchestral arrangements
- Chris Palmaro – synthesizer programming
- Dean Parks – guitar
- Paul Peabody – soloist, violin
- Wayne Pedzwater – bass
- Greg Phillinganes – fender rhodes, keyboards, rhythm arrangements, synthesizer, synthesizer bass
- Tim Pierce – guitar
- Scott Pittinsky – sound design, synthesizer programming
- Jeff Porcaro – drums
- Steve Porcaro – keyboards, orchestral realizations, programming, synthesizer, synthesizer programming
- Crystal Pounds – children's chorus, choir/chorus
- Guy Pratt – bass
- Markita Prescott – soloist
- Vincent Price – rap
- Phil Proctor – background vocals
- Phillip G. Proctor – voiceover
- Trevor Rabin – guitar
- Ronald Reagan – quotation author
- William Frank "Bill" Reichenbach Jr. – horn, trombone
- Rene – drums, keyboards, percussion, producer, synthesizer
- Seth Riggs – vocal consultant
- Teddy Riley – engineer, keyboards, mixing, producer, rhythm arrangements, synthesizer, synthesizer arrangements
- Chris Roberts – assistant engineer
- John Robinson – drums
- Nile Rodgers – guitar
- Matthew Rolston – artwork, photography
- Bill Ross – conductor, orchestral arrangements
- Darryl Ross – sound design, synthesizer programming
- William Ross – conductor
- Keith Rouster – bass
- Thom Russo – technical director
- Grace Rwaramba – staff
- Annette Sanders – choir conductor
- Andrew Scheps – drum programming, engineer, programming, sound effects, soundscape, synclavier programming, synthesizer programming
- Arnie Schulze – programming, synthesizer programming
- Seawind Horns – horn
- Jamie Seyberth – assistant engineer
- Scott "House" Shaffer – staff
- Joshua Shapera – assistant engineer
- Alan Shearman – background vocals, voiceover
- Rick Sheppard – programming, synthesizer programming
- Susan Silo – voiceover
- Slash – guest artist, guitar
- Greg Smith – keyboards, synthesizer
- Jimmy Smith – hammond b3, organ (hammond), soloist
- Rachel Smith – production coordination
- Steven Spielberg – liner notes
- Tracy Spindler – children's chorus, choir/chorus
- Brandi Stewart – children's chorus, choir/chorus
- Shawn Stockman – background vocals
- Brad Sundberg – engineer, mixing, technical director
- Gabriel Sutter – assistant engineer
- Bruce Swedien – arranger, drums, effects, engineer, liner notes, mixing, percussion, producer, sound effects, soundscape, special effects
- Roberta Swedien – sound design, synthesizer programming
- Evvy Tavasci – assistant, executive administrator
- Elizabeth Taylor – liner notes, quotation author
- Jeff Taylor – assistant engineer
- Rod Temperton – keyboards, rhythm arrangements, synthesizer, synthesizer arrangements, vocal arrangement
- Chris Theis – assistant engineer
- Michael Thompson – guitar
- Jonathon Ungar – children's chorus
- Eddie Van Halen – guest artist, guitar
- John VanNest – engineer
- Llyswen Vaughan – sample clearance
- Suzy Vaughan – sample clearance
- Stephan Vaughn – artwork, photography
- Tata Vega – background vocals
- Brian Vibberts – assistant engineer
- Gerald Vinci – concert master
- Diana Walczak – sculpture
- Randy Waldman – keyboards, synthesizer
- Stephen Walker – art direction
- Ben Wallach – assistant engineer
- Dan Wallin – engineer
- Julia Waters – background vocals
- Maxine Waters – background vocals
- Oren Waters – background vocals
- Bobby Watson – bass
- Dave Way – engineer, mixing
- Steven Paul Whitsitt – artwork, photography
- Ed Wiesnieski – narrator
- Chuck Wild – drums, keyboards, percussion, programming, sound design, sound effects, soundscape, synthesizer, synthesizer programming
- Arif St. Michael - background vocals
- Marlon D. Saunders - background vocals
- B. David Witworth - background vocals
- Maxine Willard Waters – background vocals
- Buddy Williams – drums, percussion
- David Williams – guitar
- Larry Williams – flute, horn, saxophone, synthesizer programming
- Zedric Williams – background vocals
- The Winans – background vocals
- Hattie Winston – background vocals, voiceover
- Colin Wolfe – bass
- Bill Wolfer – keyboards, synthesizer, synthesizer programming
- David "Hawk" Wolinski – fender rhodes
- Ben Wright – string arrangements
- James "Big Jim" Wright – organ, piano
- Jimmy Wright – organ, piano
- Charity Young – children's chorus, choir/chorus

== Charts ==
=== Weekly charts ===
Chart (1995–2009)	Peak position
Argentinian Albums (CAPIF)	2
Australian Albums (ARIA)	1
Austrian Albums (Ö3 Austria)	2
Belgian Albums (Ultratop Flanders)	1
Belgian Albums (Ultratop Wallonia)	1
Brazilian Albums (ABPD)	1
Canadian Albums (RPM)	1
Canadian Albums (The Record)	1
Chilean Albums (IFPI)	1
Czech Albums (IFPI)	13
Danish Albums (Hitlisten)	1
Dutch Albums (Album Top 100)	1
Estonian Albums (Eesti Top 10)	2
European Albums (Billboard)	1
Finnish Albums (Suomen virallinen albumilista)	2
French Albums (SNEP)	1
German Albums (Offizielle Top 100)	1
Hungarian Albums (MAHASZ)	4
Irish Albums (IRMA)	1
Italian Albums (FIMI)	1
Japanese Albums (Oricon)	3
Mexican Albums (Top 100 Mexico)	9
New Zealand Albums (RMNZ)	1
Norwegian Albums (VG-lista)	1
Portuguese Albums (AFP)	2
Scottish Albums (Official Charts)	1
Spanish Albums (PROMUSICAE)	2
Swedish Albums (Sverigetopplistan)	3
Swiss Albums (Schweizer Hitparade)	1
UK Albums (Official Charts)	1
UK R&B Albums (Official Charts)	1
Uruguayan Albums (CUD)	6
US Billboard 200	1
US Top R&B/Hip-Hop Albums (Billboard)	1

=== Year-end charts ===
Chart (1995)	Position
Australian Albums (ARIA)	4
Austrian Albums (Ö3 Austria)	18
Belgian Albums (Ultratop Flanders)	12
Belgian Albums (Ultratop Wallonia)	3
Canadian Albums (RPM)	11
Dutch Albums (Album Top 100)	13
European Top 100 Albums (Music & Media)	8
French Albums (SNEP)	3
German Albums (Offizielle Top 100)	12
New Zealand Albums (RMNZ)	5
Swedish Albums (Sverigetopplistan)	35
Swiss Albums (Schweizer Hitparade)	8
UK Albums (OCC)	5
US Billboard 200	32
US Top R&B/Hip-Hop Albums (Billboard)	28

Chart (1996)	Position
Australian Albums (ARIA)	13
Austrian Albums (Ö3 Austria)	23
Dutch Albums (Album Top 100)	7
European Top 100 Albums (Music & Media)	7
French Albums (IFOP)	8
German Albums (Offizielle Top 100)	11
New Zealand Albums (RMNZ)	13
Swedish Albums (Sverigetopplistan)	85
Swiss Albums (Schweizer Hitparade)	15
US Billboard 200	177

Chart (1997)	Position
Australian Albums (ARIA)	66
Belgian Albums (Ultratop Flanders)	79
Belgian Albums (Ultratop Wallonia)	65
Dutch Albums (Album Top 100)	57
European Top 100 Albums (Music & Media)	90
French Albums (SNEP)	40
German Albums (Offizielle Top 100)	80
New Zealand Albums (RMNZ)	35

Chart (2003)	Position
UK Albums (OCC)	119

Chart (2009)	Position
German Albums (Offizielle Top 100)	87

== Certifications and sales ==
Region	Certification	Certified units/sales
Argentina (CAPIF)	Platinum	60,000^{^}
Australia (ARIA)	8× Platinum	560,000^{^}
Austria (IFPI Austria)	2× Platinum	100,000^{*}
Belgium (BRMA)	5× Platinum	250,000^{*}
Brazil (Pro-Música Brasil)	Gold	350,000
Canada (Music Canada)	5× Platinum	500,000^{^}
Chile	—	25,000
Czech Republic	Platinum	
Colombia	—	120,000
Denmark (IFPI Danmark)	11× Platinum	220,000^{‡}
Finland (Musiikkituottajat)	Platinum	61,352
France (SNEP)	Diamond	1,400,000
Germany (BVMI)	3× Platinum	1,500,000^{^}
Italy (FIMI) sales + streams since 2009	Platinum	50,000^{‡}
Japan (RIAJ)	2× Platinum	750,000
Mexico (AMPROFON)	Platinum+Gold	350,000^{‡}
Mexico (AMPROFON) Greatest Hits: HIStory Volume 1	Gold	75,000^{^}
Netherlands (NVPI)	3× Platinum	350,000
New Zealand (RMNZ)	9× Platinum	135,000^{^}
Norway (IFPI Norway)	Platinum	50,000^{*}
Poland (ZPAV)	Platinum	100,000^{*}
Singapore (RIAS)	Platinum	10,000^{*}
South Africa (RISA)	3× Platinum	150,000^{‡}
South Korea	—	300,000
Spain (Promusicae)	3× Platinum	300,000^{^}
Sweden (GLF)	Platinum	100,000^{^}
Switzerland (IFPI Switzerland)	3× Platinum	150,000^{^}
Taiwan (RIT)	4× Platinum+Gold	450,000
United Kingdom (BPI)	4× Platinum	1,500,000
United Kingdom (BPI) Greatest Hits: HIStory Volume 1	Gold	100,000^{^}
United States (RIAA)	8× Platinum	4,000,000^{‡}
United States (RIAA) Greatest Hits: HIStory Volume 1	Platinum	1,000,000^{^}
Summaries
Europe (IFPI)	6× Platinum	6,000,000^{*}
^{*} Sales figures based on certification alone.^{^} Shipments figures based on certification alone.^{‡} Sales+streaming figures based on certification alone.

== See also ==
- HIStory World Tour
- List of most expensive albums
- List of best-selling albums
- List of best-selling albums in Colombia
- List of best-selling albums in Europe
- List of best-selling albums in France
- List of best-selling albums in Germany
- List of best-selling albums in Taiwan
- List of number-one albums of 1995 (U.S.)
- List of number-one R&B albums of 1995 (U.S.)
