= Diana Walczak =

American sculptor

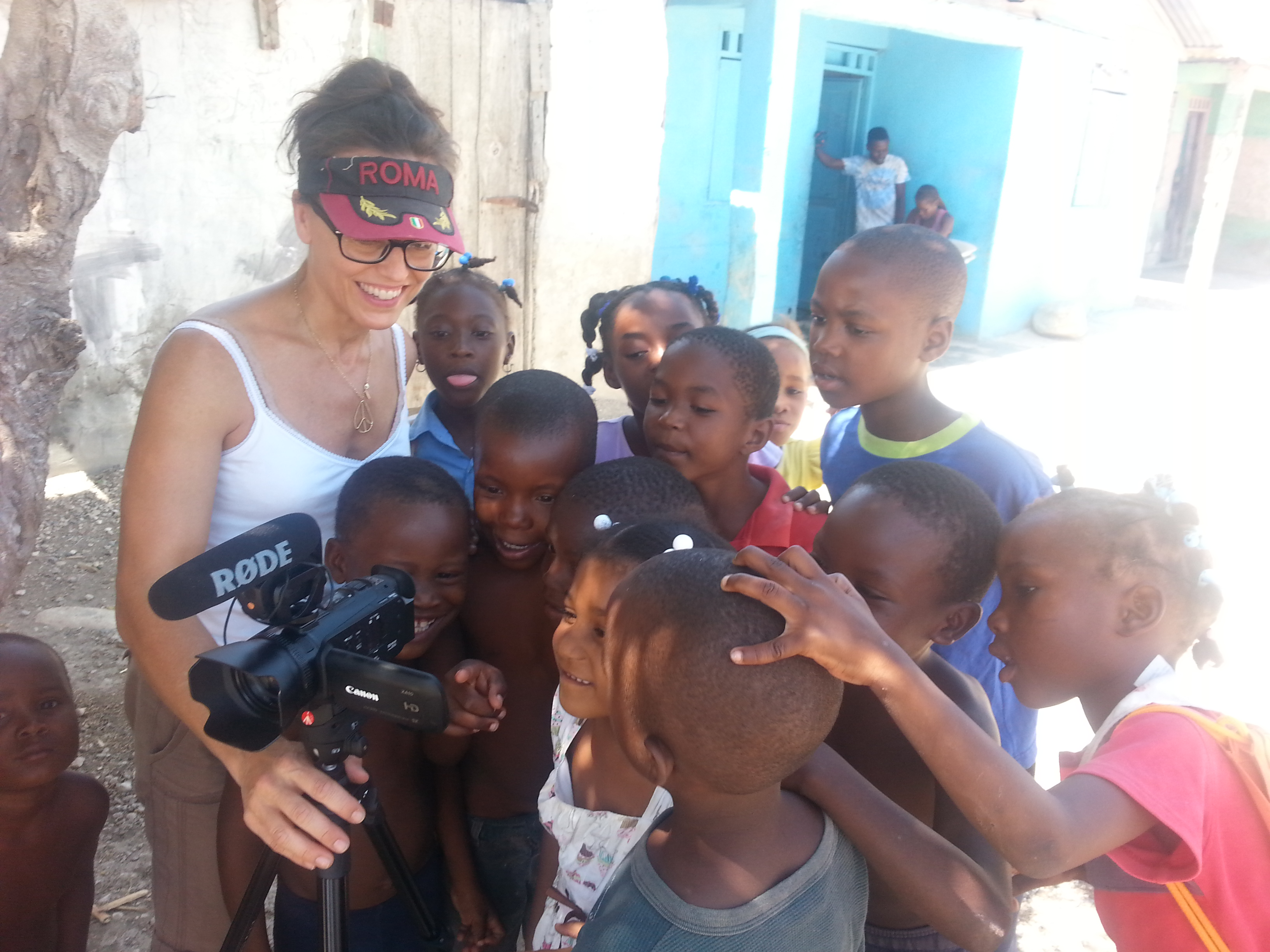
Diana Walczak shooting a film for World Connect in the Bateyes area of the Dominican Republic.

Diana Walczak is an American sculptor, computer graphics pioneer and filmmaker. She is known for creating the original Michael Jackson's HIStory Statue which she sculpted in 1994. She also created the digital representation of the statue for Michael Jackson's album, HIStory: Past, Present and Future, Book I.

== Early life and education ==
Diana Walczak began her visual arts education in the shops of her father and master printer, Jim Walczak. Diana studied engineering and sculpture at Boston University. She also assisted a medical illustrator and worked as a graphic artist for the Harvard Medical School while in college.

== Career ==
In 1986, Diana was hired by Omnibus Computer Graphics to help create a superhero figure for Marvel Comics.

In 1987, she partnered up with Jeff Kleiser to form Kleiser-Walczak Construction Company. This company is now called Synthespian Studios. They developed some of the first computer-generated humans. They created the first digital stunt doubles for the feature film, Judge Dredd starring Sylvester Stallone. They also created the first face replacements in a feature film in The One starring Jet Li. Some additional feature films in which her work can be seen include Stargate, X-Men, Fantastic Four, Surrogates and she worked on the animated Columbia Pictures film logo.

Diana has directed an advertising campaign for Sun Maid Raisins and has directed commercials starring Kobe Bryant and Hakeem Olajuwon. Diana and Jeff contributed to the digital magic behind many well-known projects including The Amazing Adventures of Spider-Man, Monsters of Grace with Philip Glass, Honey, I Shrunk the Audience!, and Radio City Music Hall's Christmas Spectacular. In 1994, she created a sculpture of Michael Jackson which became the basis for the cover of his 1995 album, HIStory: Past, Present and Future, Book I and the international marketing campaign for the album and the HIStory World Tour.

For the U.S. Department of Commerce, Diana authored a paper called Encompassing Education. This is about her vision of the future of education and the technology that goes into it. She has served on the board of directors of the Norman Rockwell Museum and currently serves on the board of directors of Images Cinema and Greylock ABC. Diana has directed numerous live-action short films under the name Harmless Little Bunny Productions including a short shot in Kenya, Haiti, the Dominican Republic, and most recently, Morocco, for World Connect.

In 2015, Walczak was a featured guest at Kingvention, an annual convention in London celebrating the life and career of Michael Jackson.

== Personal life ==
Diana Walczak loves improvising in visual arts, music, yoga and fitness, and food preparation.

== Awards ==
- 1994 – Created the original Michael Jackson HIStory statue
- 1995 – Created the image for Michael Jackson's album, HIStory: Past, Present and Future, Book I cover
- 1997 – Annecy International Animation Festival France
- 1999 – Clio award for Trophomotion commercial for Stardox
- 1999 – EDDY Award for “The Amazing Adventures of Spiderman”
- 2002 – Best Short NY International children's film Festival for “Little Miss Spider”
- 2011 – 8th Annual Keynote speaker for Women in Business Berkshire Chamber of Commerce
- 2012 – Panelist: Academy of Motion Picture Arts and Sciences’ Marc Davis Celebration of Animation
- 2013 – Music Video selected for Berkshire International Film festival Smart Phone Film Festival
- 2015 – Guest Speaker at KINGVENTION London with Live Interview with Pez Jax.
