= This Time Around (Michael Jackson song) =

Promotional single by Michael Jackson featuring the Notorious B.I.G.

from the album HIStory: Past, Present and Future, Book I
- B-side: "Earth Song"
- Released: November 21, 1995
- Recorded: 1995
- Genre: New jack swing
- Length: 4:20
- Label: Epic
- Songwriters: Michael Jackson; Dallas Austin; Bruce Swedien; René Moore; Christopher Wallace
- Producers: Michael Jackson; Dallas Austin; Bruce Swedien; René Moore

Licensed audio
- "This Time Around" on YouTube

Audio sample
- "This Time Around": file; help

"This Time Around" is a song by American singer Michael Jackson from his ninth studio album, HIStory: Past, Present and Future, Book I, with a guest appearance by rapper the Notorious B.I.G. It was released to contemporary hit radio as a promotional single in the United States on November 21, 1995. The song, which details a musician's problems with being famous and dealing with stardom, was written by Jackson, while the music was composed by Dallas Austin, Bruce Swedien and René Moore. Austin and Jackson produced the song, while Swedien and Moore served as co-producers. In the United States, "This Time Around" entered three Billboard component charts, respectively peaking at numbers 18, 23, and 36 on the Dance Music/Club Play Singles, Hot R&B/Hip-Hop Airplay, and Rhythmic Top 40 charts. It received positive reviews from contemporary music critics.

== Background and composition ==
The song and lyrics were written by Michael Jackson and The Notorious B.I.G., while the music was composed and produced by Dallas Austin, Bruce Swedien and René Moore. It was recorded by both American musicians in 1995 for Jackson's ninth studio album, entitled HIStory: Past, Present and Future, Book I, which was released in 1995 as a two-disc set.

"This Time Around" was written in common time, and was played in the key of D minor. The track's tempo is a moderate 106 beats per minute. The track has a basic sequence of Dm11–Dm9 as its chord progression. The song's lyrics are about Michael and Biggie's problems with being famous and dealing with stardom, and throughout the song Jackson asserts that he's been falsely accused as Biggie compares his issues and sympathizes with Jackson. Several remixes of the song were commissioned and released for club play promotionally; The D.M. Radio Mix was released on the remix album Blood on the Dance Floor: HIStory in the Mix in May 1997.

== Critical reception ==
The song received positive reviews from contemporary music critics in their review for the album. James Hunter of Rolling Stone described the song as being a "dynamite jam...done with Atlanta R&B hotshot Dallas Austin that's ripe for remixes". Jon Pareles of The New York Times believed that Jackson "muttered" lyrics such as "They thought they really had control of me". As a commercial single was not released for the song, "This Time Around" was ineligible to chart on the Billboard Hot 100 at the time. The track appeared on Billboard component charts in the United States based on radio and nightclub play throughout the country. It peaked at number 36 on the Billboard Rhythmic Top 40 chart in 1995. In 1996, the song peaked at number 18 on the Billboard Dance Music/Club Play Singles chart and at number 23 on the Billboard Hot R&B/Hip-Hop Airplay chart.

== Track listings ==
US CD promo

1. "This Time Around" – 4:21
2. "Earth Song" (Radio Edit) – 4:58
3. "Earth Song" – 6:46

US 12" promo

1. "This Time Around" (Dallas Main Extended Mix) – 7:15
2. "This Time Around" (Maurice's Hip Hop Around Mix) – 4:25
3. "This Time Around" (Maurice's Hip Hop Around Mix w/o Rap) – 4:25
4. "This Time Around" (Dallas Main Mix) – 6:40
5. "This Time Around" (Album Instrumental) – 4:12

== Remixes ==
David Morales mixes

- "This Time Around" (D.M. Mad Club Mix) – 10:23
- "This Time Around" (D.M. Mad Alternate Mix) – 10:36 [also known as "D.M. Mad Club Mix #2"]
- "This Time Around" (D.M. Mad Dub) – 8:00
- "This Time Around" (D.M. Radio Mix) – 4:05
- "This Time Around" (D.M. A.M. Mix) – 7:47
- "This Time Around" (D.M. Bang Da Drums Mix) – 6:34
- "This Time Around" (The Timeland Dub) – 7:22
- "This Time Around" (The Neverland Dub) – 7:46

Maurice Joshua mixes

- "This Time Around" (Maurice's Club Around Mix) – 9:00
- "This Time Around" (Maurice's Club Around Radio Mix) – 4:00
- "This Time Around" (Maurice's Hip Hop Around Mix) – 4:25
- "This Time Around" (Maurice's Hip Hop Around Mix w/ Drop) – 4:18
- "This Time Around" (Maurice's Hip Hop Around Mix w/o Rap) – 4:25

Dallas Austin mixes

- "This Time Around" (Dallas Main Extended Mix) – 7:15
- "This Time Around" (Dallas Main Mix) – 6:40
- "This Time Around" (Dallas Main Mix w/o Rap) – 6:40
- "This Time Around" (Dallas Radio Remix) – 4:31
- "This Time Around" (Dallas Radio Remix w/o Rap) – 4:31
- "This Time Around" (Dallas Clean Album Remix) – 4:21
- "This Time Around" (Album Instrumental) – 4:12

Uno Clio mixes

- "This Time Around" (Uno Clio 12" Master Mix) – 9:25
- "This Time Around" (Uno Clio Dub Mix) – 8:06

Georgie Porgie mixes

- "This Time Around" (Georgie's House N Around Mix) – 6:04

Joey "The Don" Donatello mixes

- "This Time Around" (The Don's Control This Dub) – 4:30

UBQ mix

- "This Time Around" (UBQ's Opera Vibe Dub) – 7:00

David Mitson mix

- "This Time Around" (David Mitson Clean Edit) – 4:21

== Personnel ==
- Produced by Michael Jackson, Dallas Austin, Bruce Swedien and René Moore
- Recorded by Bruce Swedien and René Moore
- Mixed by Bruce Swedien
- Arranged by Michael Jackson, Dallas Austin, Bruce Swedien, and René Moore
- Michael Jackson – lead and backing vocals
- The Notorious B.I.G. – rap
- Dallas Austin – keyboards and synthesizers
- René Moore – percussion, keyboards, and synthesizers
- Bruce Swedien – percussion
- Michael Thompson – guitar
- Keith Rouster and Colin Wolfe – bass guitar

== Charts ==
Chart performance for "This Time Around"
Chart (1995–1996)	Peak position
US Dance Club Songs (Billboard)	18
US R&B/Hip-Hop Airplay (Billboard)	23
US Rhythmic Airplay (Billboard)	36

== Release history ==
Region	Date	Format	Label	Ref.
United States	November 21, 1995	Contemporary hit radio	Epic	
