= Monsters of Grace =

1998 chamber opera by Philip Glass

- Multimedia chamber opera by Philip Glass
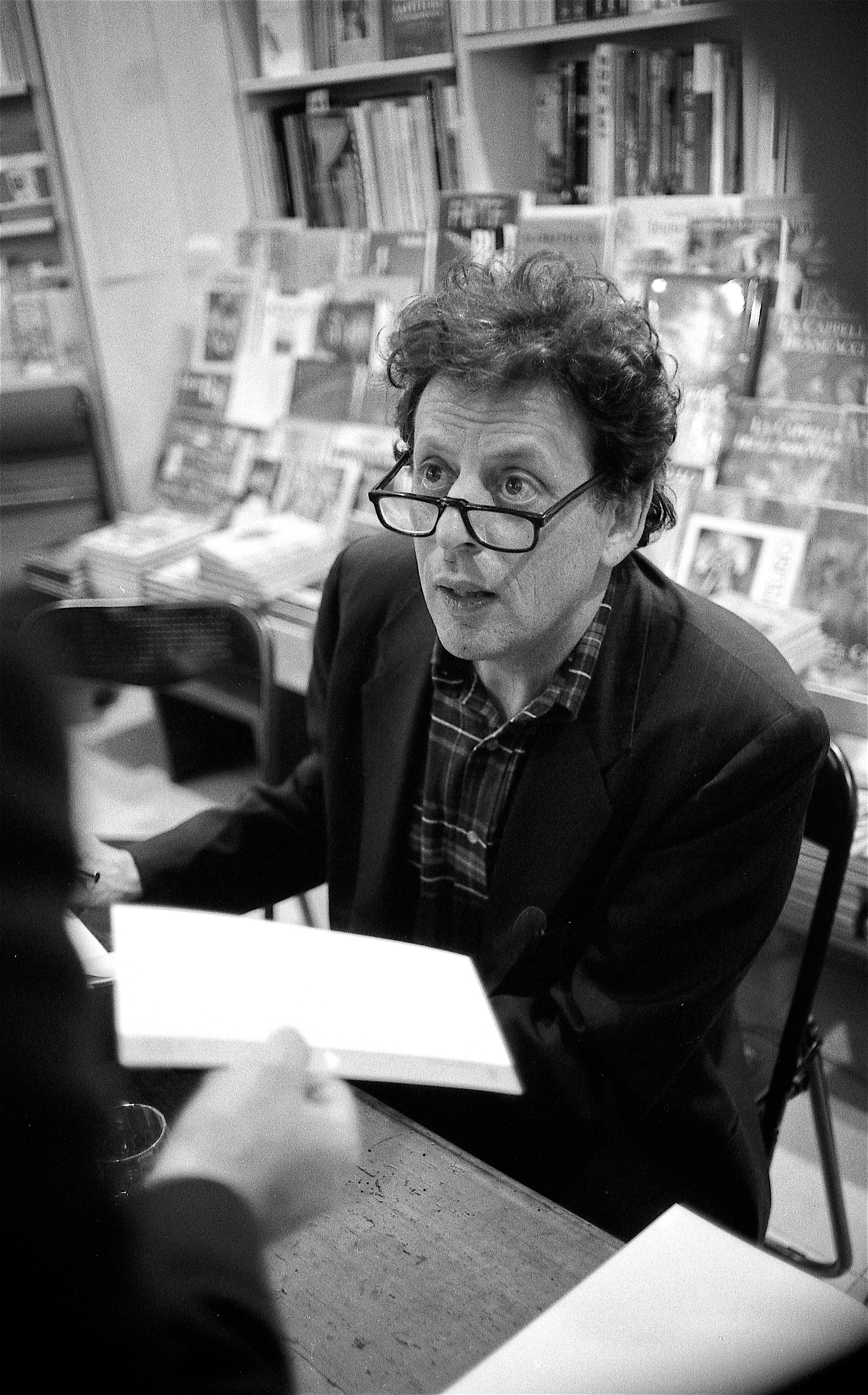
- Glass in 2006
- Librettist: Jalaluddin Rumi; Coleman Barks (translator and adapter)
- Premiere: September 9, 1998; Wolf Trap

Monsters of Grace is a multimedia chamber opera in 13 short acts directed by Robert Wilson, with music by Philip Glass and libretto from the works of 13th-century Sufi mystic Jalaluddin Rumi. The title is said to be a reference to Wilson's corruption of a line from Hamlet: "Angels and ministers of grace defend us!" (1.4.39).

== Creation of the opera ==
Originally, Wilson intended the fantastical scenarios he envisioned to actually be staged. When he realized the enormous costs and effort that would be involved in performing such a project (which included such tableaux as a gigantic hand pulling a sword from the ocean and a helicopter flying over the Great Wall of China), Wilson and producer Jed Wheeler began looking into creating the entire visual end of the production with 3D computer graphics. Wheeler eventually awarded the contract for the visual effects to the Kleiser-Walczak Construction Co., a firm that specializes in computer animation for movies.

One major drawback that seems to have been the project's main flaw was the length of time required for creating and rendering the animation. It took twenty animators almost a full year to complete the footage based on Wilson's original intent. Wilson, who has been described as liking to maintain great control over his projects and to change details at the last minute, gradually grew frustrated upon seeing how much time was required to change the animations, and ended up distancing himself from the animators. This led to a final product that, from his standpoint, was unpolished. In an interview with the New York Times, he remarked, "This is like being a dog with a litter of puppies that went away six weeks later. . . . Here I was working with people who didn't know my work, in a medium I didn't know."

== Performance history ==
It premiered in its finished form on 9 September 1998, at Wolf Trap in Vienna, Virginia. The opera was performed with live music by the Philip Glass Ensemble while a 73-minute computer-animated film in 3D was projected above the musicians. The audience wore polarized glasses to view the effect.

Although the work was initially greatly anticipated, it met with mixed reviews by critics (it was booed by some audience members following an April 1999 performance in Toronto, Ontario), and Wilson himself has remarked negatively about the project in interviews. Monsters of Grace had its last performance on 22 July 1999, in Athens, Greece.

== Recordings ==
- 2007: The complete music from the production, recorded by the Philip Glass Ensemble, was released on compact disc in early October, nearly coinciding with the 800th anniversary of Rumi's birth on 30 September.
