= Steven Paul Whitsitt =

American photographer

- Born: October 25, 1960 (age 65); Port Huron, Michigan, U.S.
- Education: Brooks Institute of Photography
- Known for: Photography

Steven Paul Whitsitt (born October 25, 1960) is an American portrait, architecture, and fashion photographer. He was Michael Jackson’s personal photographer from 1994 to 1996, during the HIStory period

== Early life ==
Born in Port Huron, Michigan. on October 25th, 1960, Steven Paul Whitsitt is the third of four children of Sally Rae Whitsitt (Hocket) and Paul Arthur Whitsitt. He enlisted in the US Navy in April of 1981 and was stationed in Ventura County, California with the United States Naval Construction Battalions, better known as the Seabees. His interest in photography started in the military, picking it up as a hobby before receiving an honorable discharge in April 1986. After his military discharge, he attended The Brooks Institute of Photography in Santa Barbara, California, and graduated in June of 1990 with a BA in Photographic Illustration

== Career ==
=== Michael Jackson ===
While working as an assistant in Los Angeles in 1993, another assistant contacted him, requesting he cover for a job they couldn't attend. That job was to assist Michael Jackson’s official photographer at the time, Sam Emerson, during the “Black or White” video. He remained as the photographer's assistant for 3 years, while simultaneously working as a freelance photographer. While working for Jackson, he went to Neverland Ranch, attended Michael Jackson’s appearance at the 1993 Super Bowl halftime show, worked on Jackson’s music videos, and assisted on the Dangerous World Tour.

After returning from the tour, Sam Emerson was let go, and he was offered the opportunity to become the head photographer based on the results from a test shoot in New York City. The shoot involved Jackson wearing a military uniform and tassels on his shoulders. Jackson was pleased with the results and hired him as the official photographer.

He was the official photographer while Jackson was recording his HIStory album, shooting stills and single covers for the songs “Smile,” “Scream,” and “You Are Not Alone.” He also covered Jackson’s philanthropy work with hospital visits and with the Heal the World Foundation.

In 2017, Whitsitt appeared as a guest at Kingvention, the annual Michael Jackson fan convention in London, where he exhibited a selection of previously unseen photographs of Jackson from his personal archive.

==== Charlie Chaplin and the "Smile" single album cover ====
Jackson always had an affinity toward Charlie Chaplin, and especially his film "The Kid." In 1994, Michael wanted to shoot a single cover for the song “Smile” in the same style as a scene from the movie where Charlie Chaplin's character sits on a stoop with Jackie Coogan in a publicity photo. He helped produce the shoot and took the photo used on the album cover. He also shot several close-up portrait shots of Michael while Michael was in the Charlie Chaplin costume. These photos, along with other photos he took, would later be featured in the official Michael Jackson Opus. The Chaplin photos were also featured at the Yuz Museum Shangai's "Charlie Chaplin. A Vision" exhibition in 2018. This is a touring collection established by the Musée de l'Élysée. His photos will become a part of the museum's permanent collection in 2020.

In 1996, he was let go during the shooting of Michael Jackson's You Are Not Alone music video, and later moved to North Carolina.

=== Teaching ===
After moving to North Carolina, he taught photography at the Carolina Friends School in Durham, North Carolina, for five years.

=== Architectural photography ===
He has worked as a residential and commercial architectural photographer since 2003, and has authored/co-authored 6 books on architectural photography, all published by Schiffer Publishing Ltd.:

- Arts & Crafts Houses
- Lowcountry Plantations: Georgia & South Carolina
- Esherick, Maloof, and Nakashima: Homes of the Master Wood Artisans
- Handmade Houses
- The Kitchen Guide
- Built with Stone: Eight Contemporary Artisans

He has received 6 Houzz awards for Best of: Design and Best of: Service from 2014 to 2017.
