= Propstore =

Auction house specializing in film memorabilia

Propstore is an auction house specializing in film memorabilia. According to KEYE-TV, the company is "one of the world’s leading auctioneers of film and television memorabilia."

== History ==
The company was founded by film enthusiast Stephen Lane in 1998. The company has approximately 70 employees across two offices located in London and Los Angeles.

In 2022, the company sold the Wilson volleyball from Cast Away and Darth Vader's gloves from Star Wars (1977).

The company made headlines in September 2025 when the lightsaber prop used by late English actor David Prowse while portraying Darth Vader in The Empire Strikes Back and Return of the Jedi broke a Star Wars franchise record for highest-valued prop sold at auction when it was sold for $USD3.6 million.
