= Tabloid Junkie =

Song by Michael Jackson

from the album HIStory: Past, Present and Future, Book I
- Released: June 20, 1995
- Recorded: 1994
- Genre: Funk rock
- Length: 4:32
- Label: Epic
- Songwriters: Michael Jackson; Jimmy Jam and Terry Lewis
- Producers: Michael Jackson; Jimmy Jam and Terry Lewis

Licensed audio
- "Tabloid Junkie" on YouTube

Audio sample
- "Tabloid Junkie": file; help

"Tabloid Junkie" is a song by the American singer and songwriter Michael Jackson from his ninth studio album, HIStory: Past, Present and Future, Book I (1995). Jackson wrote and produced it with songwriting and production duo Jimmy Jam and Terry Lewis. The song became available as the eleventh track on the album's second disc, HIStory Continues, on June 20, 1995, when it was released by Epic Records. It is a funk rock song with lyrics that address media bias and negative coverage of rumors about Jackson and his personal life, similar to previous songs recorded by Jackson. The seventh song on HIStory aimed at the media, "Tabloid Junkie" received generally positive reviews from music critics.

== Background ==
Similarly to "Leave Me Alone" (1987), "Why You Wanna Trip on Me" (1991) and numerous fellow HIStory tracks, "Tabloid Junkie", co-written by Jackson, shows Jackson's dissatisfaction with the media, particularly the tabloids. As far back as the late 1980s, Jackson and the press had a difficult relationship. In 1986, the tabloids ran a story claiming that Jackson slept in a hyperbaric oxygen chamber to slow the aging process; he was pictured lying down in a glass box. When Jackson bought a pet chimpanzee called Bubbles, it was reported as evidence of increasing detachment from reality. It was reported that Jackson had offered to buy the bones of Joseph Merrick (the "elephant man"). However, Jackson stated the story is untrue in both an interview with Oprah and an interview with Martin Bashir in Take Two – The Footage You Were Never Meant to See. Still, these stories inspired the pejorative nickname "Wacko Jacko", which Jackson acquired the following year and would come to despise. He stopped leaking untruths to the press, so the media began making up their own stories.

In 1993, the relationship between Jackson and the press came to a head when he was accused of child sexual abuse. Although never charged with a crime, Jackson was subject to intense media scrutiny while the criminal investigation took place. Complaints about the coverage included the media using sensational headlines to draw in readers and viewers when the content itself did not support the headline, accepting leaked material from the police investigation and of Jackson's alleged criminal activity in return for money, using unflattering pictures of Jackson; and using headlines that strongly implied Jackson's guilt. At the time, Jackson said of the media coverage, "I will say I am particularly upset by the handling of the matter by the incredible, terrible mass media. At every opportunity, the media has dissected and manipulated these allegations to reach their own conclusions." Jackson began taking painkillers, Valium, Xanax and Ativan to deal with the stress of the allegations made against him. When he left the United States to go into rehabilitation, the media showed him little sympathy.

== Composition ==
"Tabloid Junkie" is a funk rock song. Throughout the song, Jackson sings in a quick-voice, which some music critics viewed as Jackson "not singing" but "harrumphing". It is a plea to the public to not believe everything in the tabloids; and the lyrics are about media bias and sensational journalism about Jackson and in general. This can be heard in lyrics such as, "Just because you read it in the magazine or see it on the TV screen don't make it factual".

Jackson uses the song to criticize journalists, commenting "with your pen you torture men", describing how he was affected by the media coverage about him, and "speculate to break the one you hate", describing how reporters used sensational writing to mislead people and cast him in a negative view.

"Tabloid Junkie" is played in the key of E♭ minor and in common time signature. It has heavy beats throughout, with Jackson beatboxing throughout. Jackson's vocal range is from C♭4 to D♭5. The song's tempo is moderate, and its metronome is 111 beats per minute.

== Critical reception ==
"Tabloid Junkie" received primarily positive reviews from contemporary music critics. James Hunter, a writer for Rolling Stone, described "Tabloid Junkie", as well as "Scream", another track from the album, as being "two adventurous Jam and Lewis thumpers" that "work completely", commenting that "Jackson's slippery voice is caught in mammoth funk-rock constructions". Hunter noted that the "choruses of 'Tabloid Junkie' in particular sing out with quick-voiced warnings about the failings of media truth." Robert Christgau, a music critic who gave the album ** Honorable Mention, listed "Tabloid Junkie" as being one out of two of the album's highlights. Jim Farber, of the New York Daily News, commented that "Tabloid Junkie" sounded "like virtual satires" of the "beat-heavy sound devised" by Jam and Lewis in the 1980s.

David Browne, of Entertainment Weekly, noted that "Tabloid Junkie" comes as "close to transcendence as anywhere on the album" and described the chorus, "Just because you read it in the magazine or see it on the TV screen don't make it factual", as Jackson's "grabbiest, most driven refrain in years." Although Browne praised the song, he commented, "The rest of the song, however, is mucked up with fake tabloid-TV snippets about his 'life', and on the verses Jackson's delivery is so terse (he's not singing, he's harrumphing) that his lyrics are all but obliterated. Handed a golden opportunity, he throws it all away—but then, it wouldn't be the first time." Deepika Reedy, of The Daily Collegian, described the "rust in songs" like "Tabloid Junkie" as having a "raw aspect" that Jackson "hasn't approached since a near-miss with 'Billie Jean'." Patrick Macdonald, of The Seattle Times, noted that "Tabloid Junkie" was a "disingenuous attack on sensational news stories" about Jackson, remarked that most of stories were "planted" by Jackson himself.

== Personnel ==
- Produced by Michael Jackson, Jimmy Jam and Terry Lewis
- Recorded and mixed by Bruce Swedien
- Michael Jackson – lead and backing vocals, vocal and rhythmic arrangements
- Jimmy Jam and Terry Lewis – synthesizers and keyboards

== Bibliography ==
- Campbell, Lisa (1995). Michael Jackson: The King of Pops Darkest Hour. Branden. ISBN 0-8283-2003-9.
- Taraborrelli, J. Randy (2004). The Magic and the Madness. Terra Alta, WV: Headline. ISBN 0-330-42005-4.
