= Armie Hammer =

American actor (born 1986)

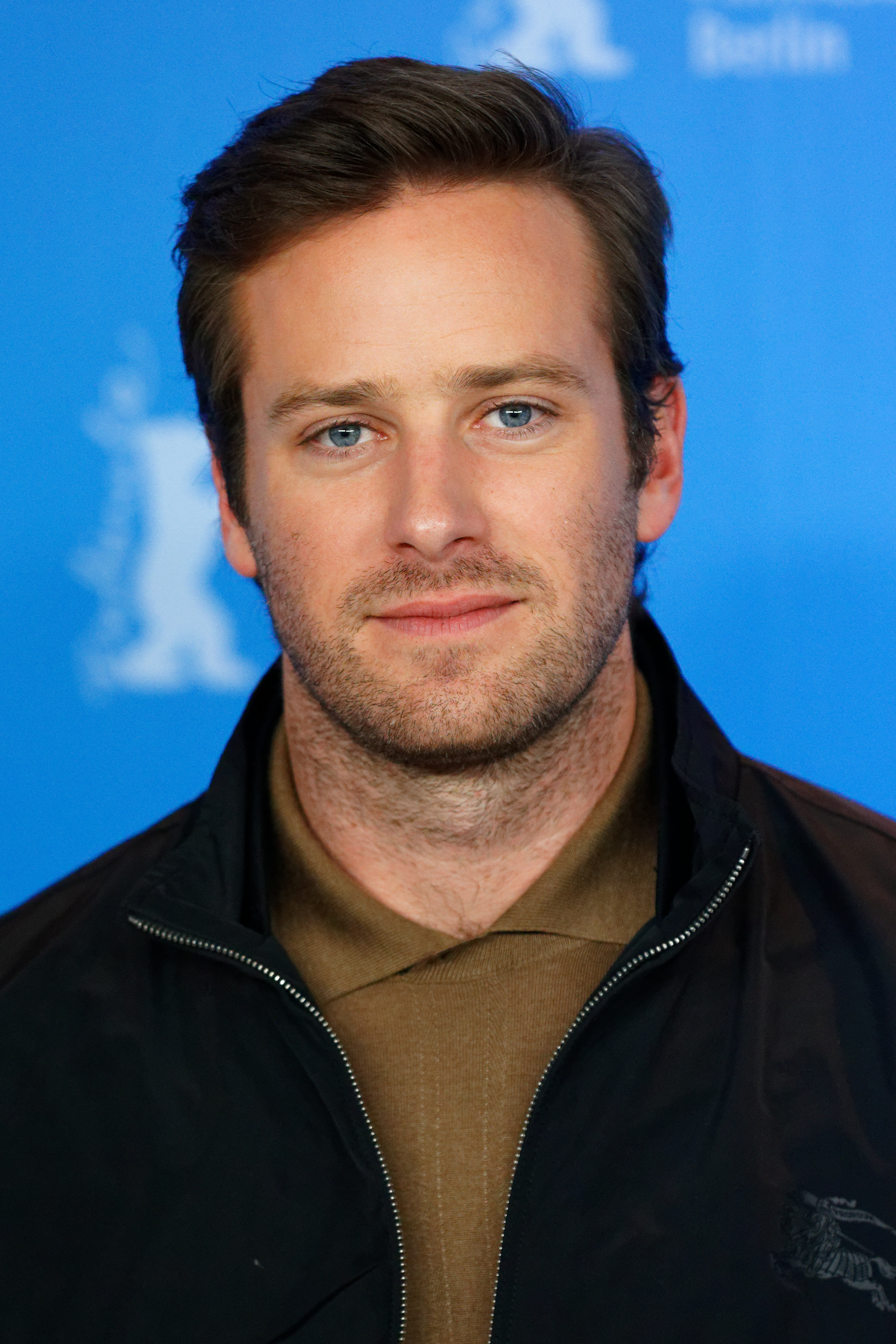
- Hammer in 2017
- Born: Armand Douglas Hammer; August 28, 1986 (age 40); Santa Monica, California, U.S.
- Occupation: Actor
- Years active: 2005–2022; 2025–present
- Spouse: Elizabeth Chambers (m. 2010; div. 2023)
- Children: 2
- Father: Michael Armand Hammer
- Relatives: Armand Hammer (great-grandfather); Olga von Root (great-grandmother); Victor Hammer (great-granduncle)

Armand Douglas Hammer (born August 28, 1986) is an American actor. He began his acting career with guest appearances in several television series. His first leading role was as Billy Graham in the 2008 film Billy: The Early Years and Hammer gained wider recognition for portraying the twins Cameron and Tyler Winklevoss in David Fincher's biopic The Social Network (2010).

Hammer portrayed Clyde Tolson in the biopic J. Edgar (2011), played the titular character in the western The Lone Ranger (2013), and starred as Illya Kuryakin in the action film The Man from U.N.C.L.E. (2015). In 2017, he starred in Luca Guadagnino's romantic drama Call Me by Your Name, for which he received a nomination for the Golden Globe for Best Supporting Actor. The following year, Hammer portrayed Martin D. Ginsburg in the biopic On the Basis of Sex (2018). On Broadway, he starred in a production of Straight White Men in 2018.

In 2021, Hammer's career was derailed when he was accused of sexual and emotional abuse by three women. He abandoned several projects and was dropped by his talent agency and publicist. Hammer denied all accusations. After an investigation by the Los Angeles County District Attorney (LACDA) and the Los Angeles Police Department (LAPD), they declined to pursue criminal charges, citing insufficient evidence. He returned to acting in 2025.

== Early life and background ==
Armand Douglas Hammer was born on August 28, 1986, in Santa Monica, California. His mother, Dru Ann (née Mobley), is a former bank loan officer, and his father, Michael Armand Hammer, owned several businesses, including Knoedler Publishing and Armand Hammer Productions, a film/television production company. He has a younger brother, Viktor, named after their great-granduncle Victor Hammer.

Hammer has described his background as "half Jewish". His paternal great-grandfather was oil tycoon and philanthropist Armand Hammer, whose parents were Jewish emigrants to the U.S. from the Russian Empire. Armand's father, Julius Hammer, was from Odesa and was an early activist in the Communist Party USA in New York. Armie's paternal great-grandmother was the Russian-born actress and singer Baroness Olga Vadimovna von Root, from Sevastopol, the daughter of a tsarist general. His paternal grandmother was from Texas, while his mother's family is from Tulsa, Oklahoma.

Hammer resided in Highland Park, Texas, an affluent town in the Dallas area, for several years. When he was seven, his family moved to the Cayman Islands, where they lived for five years, and then settled in Los Angeles. While residing in the Cayman Islands, he attended Faulkner's Academy in Governor's Harbour and Grace Christian Academy (a school founded by his father) in West Bay, Grand Cayman. As a teen, he attended Los Angeles Baptist High School in the San Fernando Valley. He dropped out of high school in eleventh grade to pursue an acting career. However, he subsequently took college courses at UCLA. Hammer said his parents disowned him when he decided to leave school and take up acting but later became supportive and proud of his work.

== Career ==
=== 2005–2015: Early work and breakthrough ===
Hammer's professional acting career began with small guest appearances in the television series Arrested Development, Veronica Mars, Gossip Girl, Reaper and Desperate Housewives. His first ventures into film began with a minor role in the 2006 film Flicka, as well as co-starring in a 2008 psychological thriller, Blackout. His first leading role in film came with his portrayal of the Christian evangelist Billy Graham in Billy: The Early Years, which premiered in October 2008. The film garnered Hammer a "Faith and Values Award" nomination in the Grace Award category, which is awarded for the Most Inspiring Performance in Movie or Television by Mediaguide, an organization that provides movie reviews from a Christian perspective.

After a long search, Hammer was hand-picked in 2007 by filmmaker George Miller to star in the planned superhero film Justice League: Mortal, as Bruce Wayne / Batman. The film, which was to be directed by Miller, was eventually canceled. The film's cancellation came in large part due to the looming 2007–08 Writers Guild of America strike as well as stalled budgetary rebate negotiations with the Australian Government. In 2009, he played Harrison Bergeron in 2081, based on the short story of the same name by author Kurt Vonnegut, which premiered at the Seattle International Film Festival.

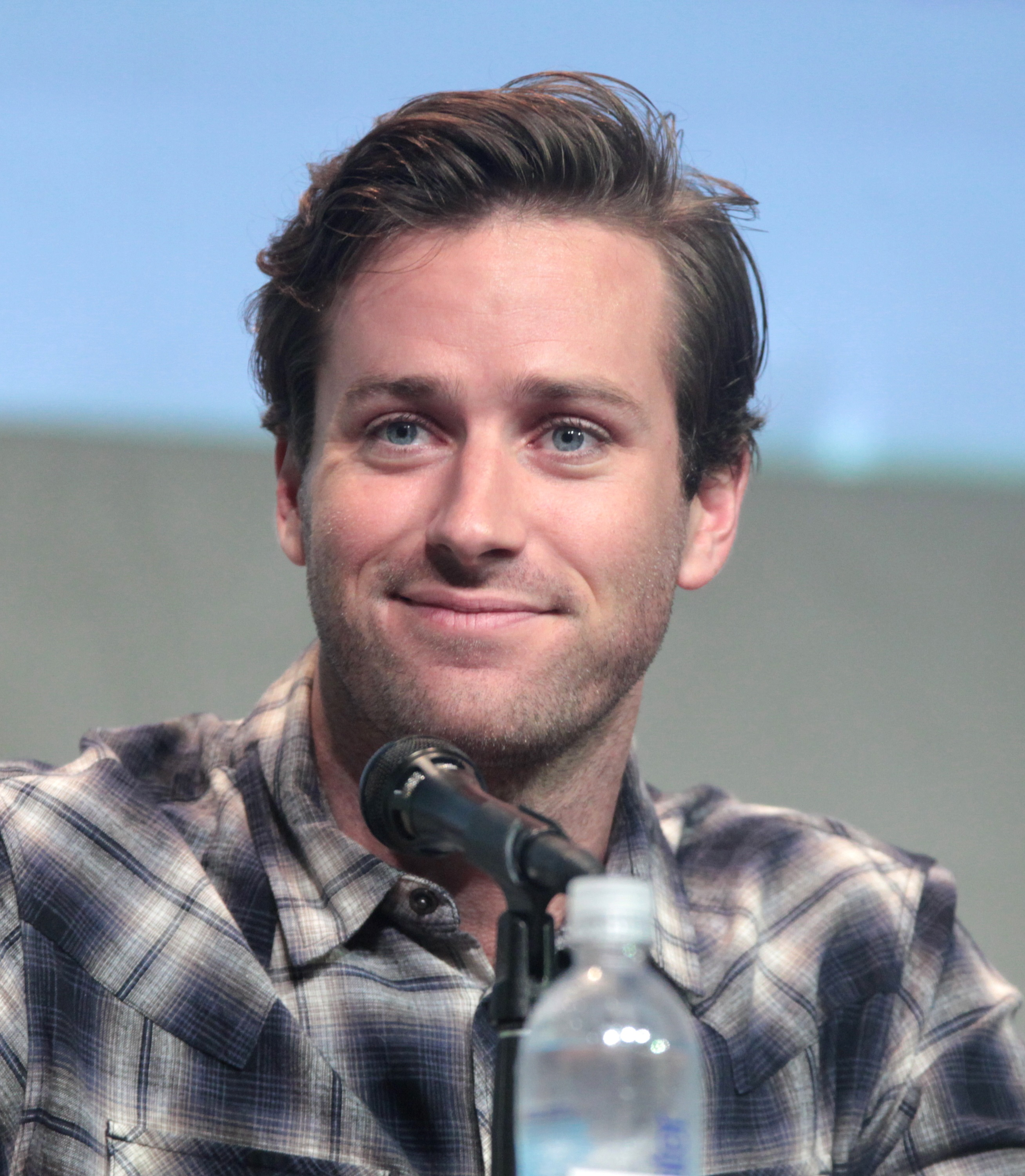
Hammer at the 2015 San Diego Comic-Con

In 2010, Hammer's breakthrough film role was in David Fincher's The Social Network, about the creation of Facebook. He portrayed the identical twins Cameron and Tyler Winklevoss, with actor Josh Pence serving as a body double during filming. The filmmakers utilized computer-generated imagery during post-production to superimpose Hammer's face over Pence's as well as the use of split-screen photography in certain scenes. In preparation for the film, Hammer stated that he had to learn how to row on both sides of a boat in order to play the twins, who are rowing champions. Hammer and Pence also went through 10 months of extensive twin boot camp in preparation for their roles, in order to "drill the subtle movements and speech patterns that the Winklevosses would have developed over two decades of genetic equality." This film earned Hammer his first critical plaudits, with Richard Corliss of Time magazine remarking that Hammer's portrayal of the twins was "an astonishingly subtle trompe-l'œil of special effects". For his role in the film, Hammer won Toronto Film Critics Association Awards 2010 for Best Supporting Actor.

Hammer's next role was that of the first associate director of the FBI, Clyde Tolson, in Clint Eastwood's 2011 film J. Edgar. The biographical drama, written by Dustin Lance Black, focused on the expansive career of J. Edgar Hoover, of which the titular role was portrayed by Leonardo DiCaprio. While the film received mixed reviews overall, with some pointed criticism of the makeup used to age DiCaprio and Hammer's characters, the acting was largely praised. David Denby of The New Yorker called Hammer's performance "charming", and The Hollywood Reporter's Todd McCarthy described it as "excellent". McCarthy goes on further in his review to particularly praise the chemistry between DiCaprio and Hammer, specifically in their depiction of the often speculated romantic relationship between their characters, observing that "the way the homoerotic undertones and impulses are handled is one of the best things about the film; the emotional dynamics, given all the social and political factors at play, feel entirely credible, and DiCaprio and Hammer excel during the exchanges of innuendo, covert desire, recriminations and mutual understanding." DiCaprio and Hammer both received nods at the 18th Screen Actors Guild Awards.

In January 2012, Hammer voiced the Winklevoss twins in an episode of The Simpsons titled "The D'oh-cial Network". He also co-starred with Julia Roberts and Lily Collins in Mirror Mirror which was released in the following March, playing Prince Andrew Alcott. The following year, Hammer was cast as the title role of Disney's, The Lone Ranger, alongside Johnny Depp as Tonto, in an adaptation of the radio and film serials of the character of the same name. The film, released theatrically in July 2013, was considered a box office failure, grossing only $260.5 million worldwide on a reported budget of $215 million. In 2015, he starred in director Guy Ritchie's The Man from U.N.C.L.E., a feature film adaptation of the 1960s TV show The Man from U.N.C.L.E., playing Illya Kuryakin, opposite Henry Cavill.

=== 2016–2021: Career progression ===
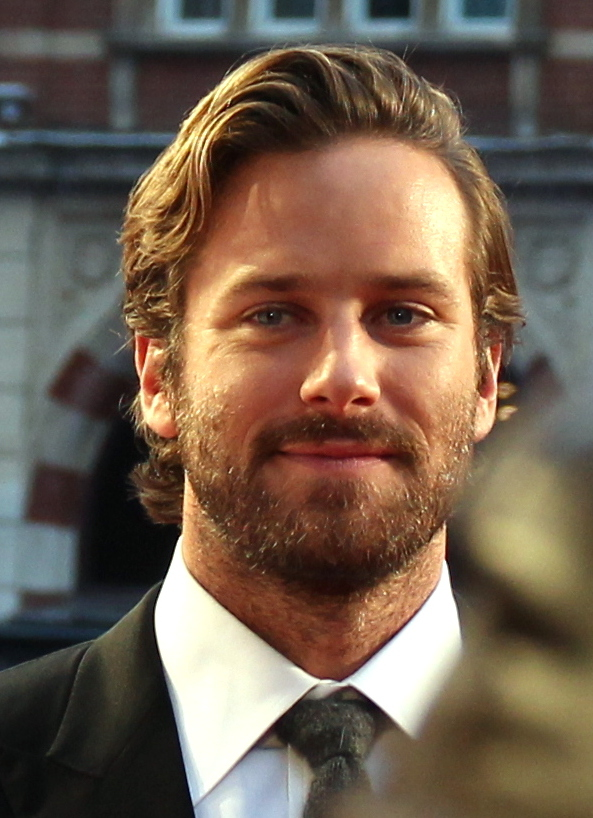
Hammer attending a screening of Nocturnal Animals at the 2016 BFI London Film Festival

Hammer played Sam Turner in the film The Birth of a Nation (2016), directed by Nate Parker. The film, which premiered in competition at the 2016 Sundance Film Festival, won both the Audience Award and Grand Jury Prize in the U.S. Dramatic Competition. In January 2016, it was revealed that since 2013, Hammer was in contact with the family of the infamous drug lord Edgar Valdez Villarreal and secured the rights to film the life story of the cartel leader. He then had a role in the ensemble of Tom Ford's psychological thriller Nocturnal Animals, played Ord in the action film Free Fire, which was written and directed by Ben Wheatley, and played U.S. Marine Mike Stevens in Mine.

In 2017, Hammer starred as Oliver in Call Me by Your Name, starring opposite Timothée Chalamet. The film, an adaptation of the novel of the same name by André Aciman, was directed by Luca Guadagnino. Production began in May 2016, and the film premiered at the 2017 Sundance Film Festival. For his performance, Hammer received acclaim and nominations for the Critics' Choice Award, the Independent Spirit Award, and the Golden Globe Award in Best Supporting Actor category. Film critic Richard Lawson of Vanity Fair said that Hammer utilized "his ludicrous proportions and chiseled handsomeness to great, surprisingly witty and sensitive effect." Hammer's acclaim was further echoed by Peter Travers; he wrote for Rolling Stone magazine: "a revelation, giving his most complex screen role to date the tightrope thrill of full immersion." Often highlighted was the "ridiculous chemistry" between Hammer and Chalamet, in which Christy Lemire of RogerEbert.com found the pairing successful, in part due to Hammer's skill in finding the "tricky balance between the character's swagger and his vulnerability as he gives himself over to this exciting affair." Hammer also narrated the audiobook, which was published by Macmillan Publishers.

In the same year, Hammer voiced Jackson Storm, the main antagonist, in Disney-Pixar's animated film Cars 3, as well as starred alongside Geoffrey Rush in director Stanley Tucci's Final Portrait. The film premiered at the 67th Berlin International Film Festival and received a theatrical release the following year in the U.S. by Sony Pictures Classics to favorable reviews. Owen Gleiberman of Variety praised Hammer's ability to "suggest turbulent eddies of thought beneath the blondish Clark Kent looks and preppie manners." The Village Voice critic found the performances "uniformly strong" and cited Hammer's portrayal of American author James Lord as the "comic highlight".

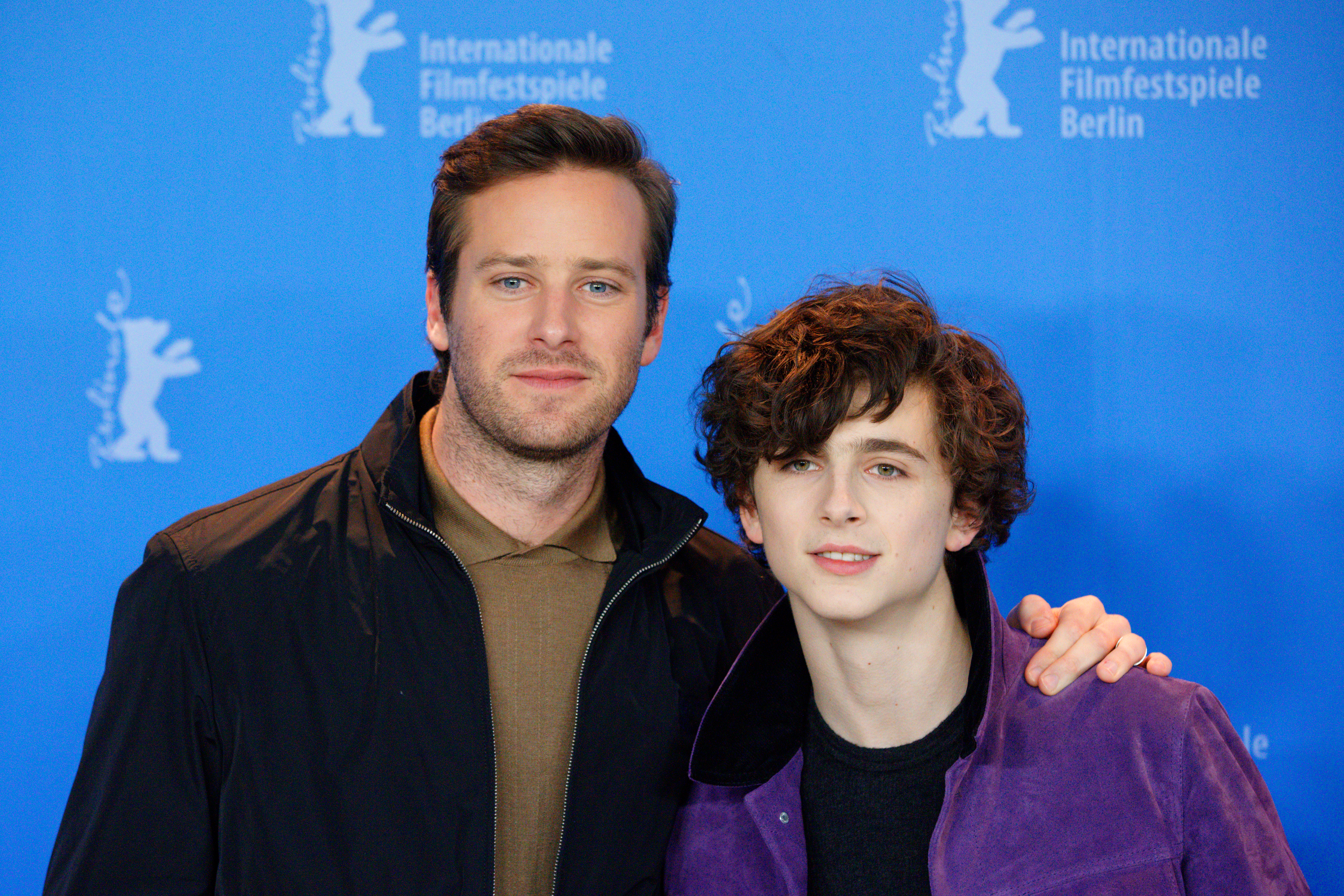
Hammer and his Call Me by Your Name co-star Timothée Chalamet at the 2017 Berlin International Film Festival

In 2018, Hammer co-starred in Boots Riley's dark comedy Sorry to Bother You alongside Lakeith Stanfield, Steven Yeun, and Tessa Thompson. Film Journal International critic Tomris Laffly described Hammer's character, Steve Lift, as an "irresistibly funny" and "coke-snorting, abominable villain". The film premiered at the 2018 Sundance Film Festival on January 20. It won the 2019 National Board of Review's Top Ten Independent Films award and won Independent Spirit Award for Best First Feature, while also nominated for Best Screenplay, at the 34th Independent Spirit Awards. He then appeared as David in the thriller Hotel Mumbai, about the 2008 Mumbai attacks. The film premiered at the 2018 Toronto International Film Festival on September 7, 2018. In the same year, Hammer starred alongside Felicity Jones, playing taxation law expert Martin D. Ginsburg, the spouse of Supreme Court Justice Ruth Bader Ginsburg, in On the Basis of Sex, a biographical legal drama film based on the life and early cases of Ginsburg, directed by Mimi Leder. It premiered at the AFI Fest on November 8, 2018. In June 2018, Hammer led as Drew in Straight White Men at Second Stage Theater on Broadway. For his notable film works from 2017 to 2018, Hammer was awarded "Outstanding Achievement in Cinema" by The SCAD Savannah Film Festival.

In 2019, Hammer starred in Babak Anvari's psychological horror film Wounds alongside Dakota Johnson. It premiered at the 2019 Sundance Film Festival on January 26. In 2020, he starred as Maxim de Winter in an adaptation of Daphne du Maurier's Gothic romance novel Rebecca, again directed by Wheatley and co-starring Lily James; and in 2021, he appeared with Gary Oldman and Evangeline Lilly in the opioid crisis thriller Crisis. Hammer was also part of an ensemble cast in director Kenneth Branagh's adaptation of Agatha Christie's Death on the Nile. While filmed in 2019, it was released only in 2022 due to the COVID-19 pandemic.

=== 2021–present: Setback, hiatus, and return ===
In 2021, Hammer both dropped out of and was dropped from a number of acting productions in development in the wake of sexual and emotional abuse allegations, including a sexual assault investigation. Hammer dropped out of the film Shotgun Wedding, departed from his leading role in the Paramount+ drama miniseries The Offer, stepped away from the Starz limited series Gaslit, as well as the Broadway play The Minutes, and was removed from Billion Dollar Spy. Talent agency William Morris Endeavor dropped Hammer as a client, and it was reported that his publicist would no longer represent him. In December 2021, it was revealed his role in the Taika Waititi's film Next Goal Wins had been reshot, with Will Arnett taking over Hammer's role. While Hammer's role in Death on the Nile could not be reshot, he was not involved in promotion when the film was released in February 2022 and, unlike the other stars, did not appear on an individual character poster.

In 2024, Hammer launched a podcast, Armie HammerTime, where he discussed his life and interviewed other celebrities. The Guardian commented that Hammer seemed "more interested in talking about himself" than conducting the interviews but that with some work on it, the podcast could potentially help him have a career resurgence. Hammer returned to acting with the western film Frontier Crucible, released in December 2025. In 2026, he starred in Uwe Boll's controversial crime film Citizen Vigilante. He is also being cast for the short film Enceladus.

== Personal life ==
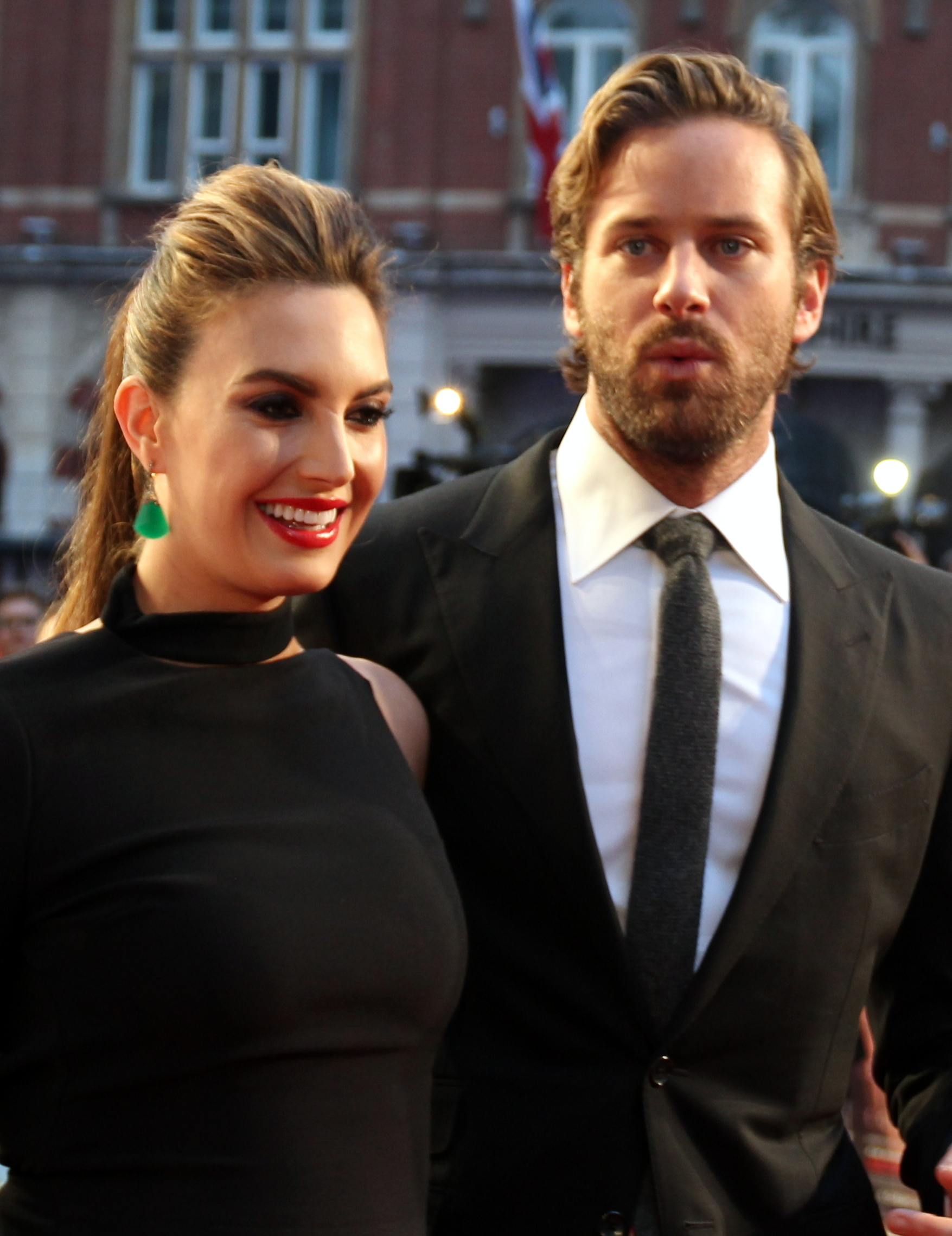
Hammer and then-wife Elizabeth Chambers at the 2016 BFI London Film Festival

In May 2010, Hammer married television personality Elizabeth Chambers. Hammer's friend, artist Tyler Ramsey, introduced the pair. They have two children. On July 10, 2020, Hammer and Chambers announced their separation via Instagram. In June 2023, it was announced that Hammer and Chambers had reached a divorce settlement.

In 2011, Hammer was arrested at a United States Border Patrol checkpoint in West Texas after marijuana was discovered in his car. El Paso's attorney declined to prosecute the case, as the amount of marijuana Hammer had would only amount to a misdemeanor. In 2013, Hammer said the arrest "was a misunderstanding of laws [between] interstate laws versus state laws and apparently federal laws supersede state laws".

In 2022, during his hiatus from acting, Hammer was living in the Cayman Islands to be near Chambers and their children. He held several jobs there, including selling timeshares and as a manager for an apartment complex. In 2024, Hammer moved back to Los Angeles after being refused subsequent work permits in the Cayman Islands. He later said he was in a "bad financial state", due to limited acting work following the abuse allegations against him and not wishing to ask his family for money.

In 2023, Hammer said that he had been sexually assaulted at age 13 by a youth pastor. In the same interview, he disclosed that he was a BDSM practitioner and that getting married young had prevented him from indulging that inclination, which later led him to pursue extramarital affairs. He speculated that his taste for playing the dominant role resulted from having been molested as a child, which made him feel the need to be sexually in control.

Hammer's Armie HammerTime Podcast explores a range of topics related to his personal life. In one of the episodes, Hammer expressed his fondness for nudity in his personal lifestyle, and that he loves being naked in his house and enjoys walking around naked. In another episode, Hammer stated that he had once used Grindr to organise a "hookup" with a man because he was willing to give gay sex "a try", but was unable to go through with it after failing to get aroused.

=== Abuse allegations ===
In January 2021, an anonymous Instagram account published screenshots of sexually charged text messages it claimed Hammer had sent to various women. In those messages, Hammer appeared to discuss fetishes for violent, dominating sex, as well as a fascination with cannibalism. Hammer denied the validity of the text messages, calling them an "online attack" and "bullshit claims". That same month, the Cayman police spoke to Hammer about leaked videos in which he stated he had sex with "Miss Cayman" in the Cayman Islands. He later apologized to the Cayman Compass, clarifying the woman he referred to in the videos was not associated with the Miss Cayman Islands beauty pageant.

Two months later, Hammer's ex-girlfriend Efrosina Angelova, also known as Effie, came forward as the owner of the Instagram account and accused Hammer of raping her in April 2017. Two other women then alleged abuse by Hammer in Page Six: Courtney Vucekovich claimed he subjected her to emotional abuse, expressed a desire to cook and eat one of her ribs, and that she attended a hospitalization program for post-traumatic stress disorder (PTSD) following the relationship. Paige Lorenze claimed Hammer "branded her, purposefully left her covered in bruises, and talked about 'consuming her'". In response, Hammer's legal team stated "the assertions about Mr. Hammer are patently untrue. Any interactions with any partner of his were completely consensual in that they were fully discussed, agreed upon, and mutually participatory." After the allegations were made, Hammer was removed from a number of film projects and dropped out of others himself.

In March 2021, the LAPD launched an investigation into the accusations, which concluded that December. Hammer's attorney stated, "There was never a case, never a lawsuit, never a criminal proceeding against anyone. ... There wasn't any matter for me to handle other than to help him manage his image in the press". The allegations feature in the 2022 documentary series House of Hammer. In September 2022, it was reported that attorney Gloria Allred refused to represent Angelova after she "wouldn't sign a declaration under perjury [regarding] her accusations". Angelova said in 2025 that Allred had withdrawn as her attorney when she refused to retroactively grant Allred permission to speak about her case in House of Hammer; Angelova claims that prior to the film, she asked Allred not to discuss her case with the filmmakers.

In February 2023, Air Mail published an article questioning the details of the accusations and including Hammer's first in-depth interview on the matter. Hammer admitted to consensual BDSM and to extramarital affairs, but denied claims of sexual abuse and cannibalism. He said that what Angelova described as rape had been part of a sexual roleplay between them, and that she was motivated by jealousy after realizing that he was unwilling to commit to a serious relationship with her. Hammer also acknowledged that he had been oblivious to the fact that his status as a wealthy celebrity created an "imbalance of power" in his relationships with younger women.

In May 2023, the Los Angeles County District Attorney declined to indict Hammer, citing insufficient evidence. In July 2024, Hammer's mother, Dru Ann, addressed the allegations in her book Hammered. He discussed the accusations and his personal changes in an interview on Piers Morgan Uncensored in July 2024, and also on The Louis Theroux Podcast in February 2025.

== Filmography ==
=== Film ===
Year	Title	Role	Notes
2006	Flicka	Male prefect	
2008	Blackout	Tommy	
2008	Billy: The Early Years	Billy Graham	
2009	Spring Breakdown	Beachcomber boy	
2009	2081	Harrison Bergeron	Short film
2010	The Social Network	Cameron and Tyler Winklevoss	
2011	J. Edgar	Clyde Tolson	
2012	Mirror Mirror	Prince Andrew Alcott	
2012	The Polar Bears	Zook	Voice; short film
2013	The Lone Ranger	John Reid / The Lone Ranger	
2015	Entourage	Himself	Cameo
2015	The Man from U.N.C.L.E.	Illya Kuryakin	
2016	The Birth of a Nation	Samuel Turner	
2016	Nocturnal Animals	Hutton Morrow	
2016	Free Fire	Ord	
2016	Mine	Mike Stevens	
2017	Call Me by Your Name	Oliver	
2017	Final Portrait	James Lord	
2017	Cars 3	Jackson Storm	Voice
2018	Sorry to Bother You	Steve Lift	
2018	Hotel Mumbai	David	
2018	On the Basis of Sex	Martin D. Ginsburg	
2019	Wounds	Will	
2020	Query	Jim	Short film
2020	Rebecca	Maxim de Winter	
2021	Crisis	Jake Kahane	
2022	Death on the Nile	Simon Doyle	
2025	Frontier Crucible	Edmund	
2026	Citizen Vigilante	Michael Sanders	
TBA	Night Driver †	Sonny	Post-production
TBA	Mascotland †	Davey Bluejay	Post-production
TBA	Tokyo Blitz †	Rick	Post-production
TBA	Enceladus †	TBA	Short Film, Also Post-Production

Key
†	Denotes films that have not yet been released

=== Television ===
Year	Title	Role	Notes
2005	Arrested Development	Student #2	Episode: "The Immaculate Election"
2006	Veronica Mars	Kurt	Episode: "Wichita Linebacker"
2007	Desperate Housewives	Barrett	Episode: "Distant Past"
2009	Reaper	Morgan	5 episodes
2009	Gossip Girl	Gabriel Edwards	4 episodes
2012	The Simpsons	Cameron and Tyler Winklevoss	Voice; episode: "The D'oh-cial Network"
2012	American Dad!	Car rental agent	Voice; episode: "The Wrestler"
2014	Stan Lee's Mighty 7	Strong Arm	Voice; television film
2018	Last Week Tonight with John Oliver	Himself	Guest; 1 episode
2019	Running Wild with Bear Grylls	Himself	Guest; 1 episode

=== Theatre ===
Year	Title	Role	Venue	Ref.
2018	Straight White Men	Drew	Hayes Theater, Broadway	
2020	The Minutes	Mr. Peel	Studio 54, Broadway	

=== Video games ===
Year	Title	Voice role	Ref.
2013	Disney Infinity	John Reid / The Lone Ranger	
2014	Disney Infinity 2.0	John Reid / The Lone Ranger	
2015	Disney Infinity 3.0	John Reid / The Lone Ranger	

== Awards and nominations ==
Year	Award	Category	Nominated work	Result	Ref.
2010	Alliance of Women Film Journalists	Best Ensemble Cast	The Social Network	Nominated	
2010	Hollywood Film Festival	Ensemble of the Year	The Social Network	Won	
2010	Toronto Film Critics Association Awards	Best Supporting Actor	The Social Network	Won	
2010	Chicago Film Critics Association Awards	Most Promising Performer	The Social Network	Nominated	
2010	Phoenix Film Critics Society Awards	Best Ensemble Acting	The Social Network	Won	
2010	San Diego Film Critics Society Awards	Best Ensemble Performance	The Social Network	Nominated	
2010	Southeastern Film Critics Association Awards	Best Ensemble	The Social Network	Won	
2010	Village Voice Film Poll	Best Supporting Actor	The Social Network	8th place	
2010	Washington D.C. Area Film Critics Association Awards	Best Ensemble	The Social Network	Nominated	
2011	Central Ohio Film Critics Association	Best Ensemble	The Social Network	Nominated	
2011	Critics' Choice Awards	Best Acting Ensemble	The Social Network	Nominated	
2011	Palm Springs International Film Festival	Ensemble Cast Award	The Social Network	Won	
2011	Screen Actors Guild Awards	Outstanding Performance by a Cast in a Motion Picture	The Social Network	Nominated	
2011	Teen Choice Awards	Choice Movie Breakout: Male	The Social Network	Nominated	
2011	Young Hollywood Awards	Male Star of Tomorrow	—	Won	
2011	Dallas–Fort Worth Film Critics Association Awards	Best Supporting Actor	J. Edgar	4th place	
2011	Houston Film Critics Society Award	Best Supporting Actor	J. Edgar	Nominated	
2012	Screen Actors Guild Awards	Outstanding Performance by a Male Actor in a Supporting Role	J. Edgar	Nominated	
2013	CinemaCon	Male Star of Tomorrow	—	Won	
2013	Teen Choice Awards	Choice Movie: Chemistry (shared with Johnny Depp)	The Lone Ranger	Nominated	
2016	San Diego Film Critics Society Awards	Best Ensemble	Nocturnal Animals	Nominated	
2017	Central Ohio Film Critics Association	Best Ensemble	Nocturnal Animals	Nominated	
2017	Austin Film Critics Association Awards	Best Supporting Actor	Call Me by Your Name	Nominated	
2017	Chicago Film Critics Association Awards	Best Supporting Actor	Call Me by Your Name	Nominated	
2017	Dallas–Fort Worth Film Critics Association Awards	Best Supporting Actor	Call Me by Your Name	4th place	
2017	Dublin Film Critics' Circle	Best Actor	Call Me by Your Name	6th place	
2017	Florida Film Critics Circle Awards	Best Supporting Actor	Call Me by Your Name	Nominated	
2017	IndieWire Critics Poll	Best Supporting Actor	Call Me by Your Name	3rd place	
2017	Online Film Critics Society Awards	Best Supporting Actor	Call Me by Your Name	Nominated	
2017	Phoenix Critics Circle	Best Supporting Actor	Call Me by Your Name	Nominated	
2017	San Francisco Film Critics Circle Awards	Best Supporting Actor	Call Me by Your Name	Nominated	
2017	Seattle Film Critics Society	Best Ensemble Cast	Call Me by Your Name	Nominated	
2017	Washington D.C. Area Film Critics Association Awards	Best Supporting Actor	Call Me by Your Name	Nominated	
2017	Vancouver Film Critics Circle Awards	Best Supporting Actor	Call Me by Your Name	Nominated	
2018	AACTA Awards	Best Supporting Actor	Call Me by Your Name	Nominated	
2018	Chlotrudis Awards	Best Performance by an Ensemble Cast	Call Me by Your Name	Nominated	
2018	Critics' Choice Awards	Best Supporting Actor	Call Me by Your Name	Nominated	
2018	Denver Film Critics Society	Best Supporting Actor	Call Me by Your Name	Nominated	
2018	Dorian Awards	Supporting Film Performance of the Year—Actor	Call Me by Your Name	Nominated	
2018	Empire Awards	Best Actor	Call Me by Your Name	Nominated	
2018	Golden Globe Awards	Best Supporting Actor – Motion Picture	Call Me by Your Name	Nominated	
2018	Independent Spirit Awards	Best Supporting Male	Call Me by Your Name	Nominated	
2018	Iowa Film Critics Association	Best Supporting Actor	Call Me by Your Name	Nominated	
2018	Satellite Awards	Best Supporting Actor	Call Me by Your Name	Nominated	
2018	Village Voice Film Poll	Best Supporting Performance	Call Me by Your Name	12th place	
2018	Texas Film Hall of Fame	One to Acclaim Award	—	Won	
2018	SCAD Savannah Film Festival	Outstanding Achievement in Cinema	Call Me by Your Name, Sorry to Bother You, Hotel Mumbai, and On the Basis of Sex	Won	
2019	Shorty Awards	Storyteller of the Year	—	Nominated	
2019	Broadway.com Audience Awards	Favorite Breakthrough Performance (Male)	Straight White Men	Nominated	
