= Geldon =

Geldon may refer to:

- A long spear used by the Flemish militias, notably at the Battle of the Golden Spurs
- The dragon Geldon from South Park
