= Armand Hammer =

American businessman (1898–1990)

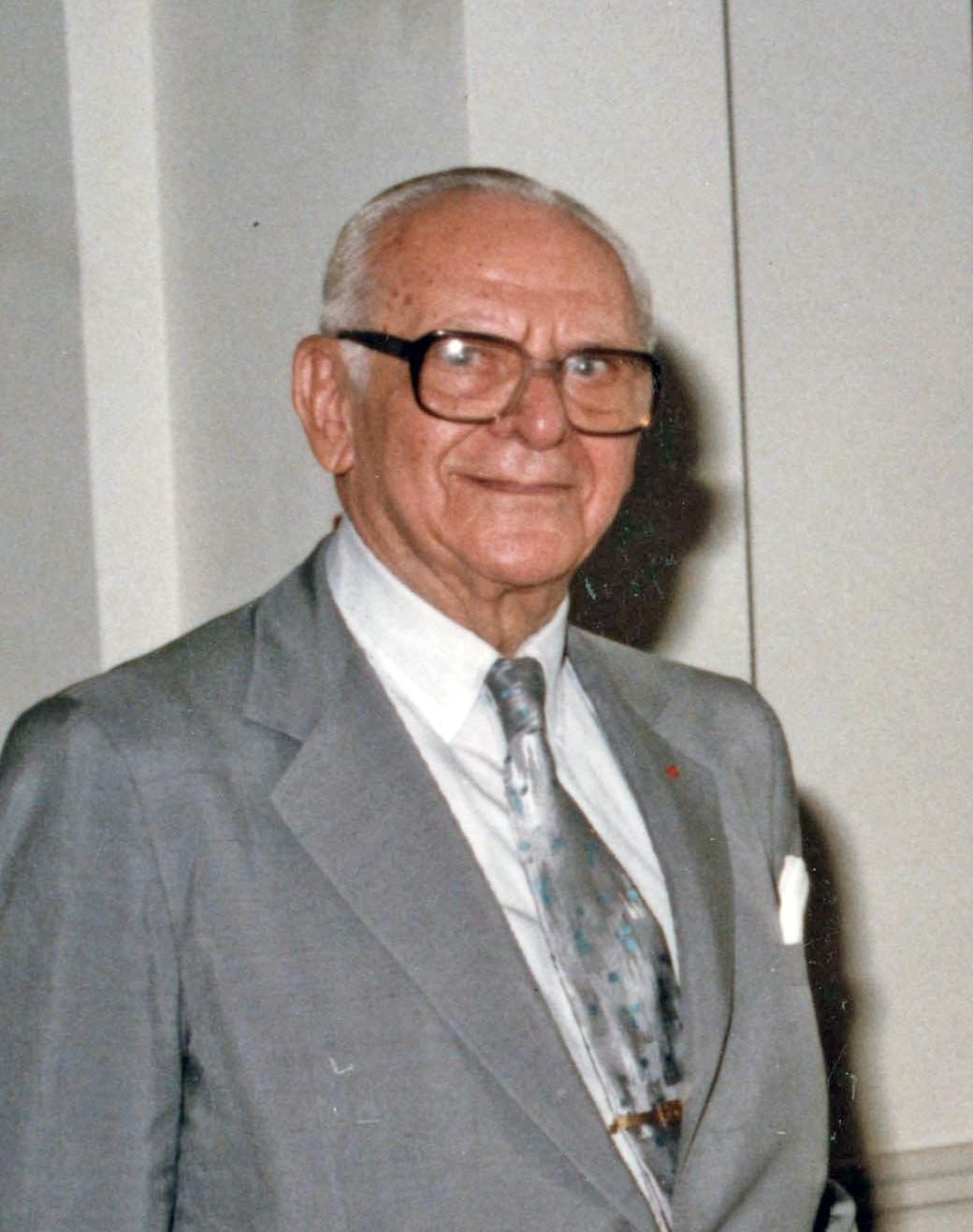
- Hammer in 1982
- Born: May 21, 1898; New York City, U.S.
- Died: December 10, 1990 (aged 92); Los Angeles, California, U.S.
- Education: Columbia University (B.A., 1919; M.D., 1921)
- Occupation: Business magnate
- Spouses: Olga Vadina von Root (m. 1927; div. 1943) Angela Carey Zevely (div. 1954) Frances Barrett Tolman (m. 1956; died 1989)
- Children: Julian Armand Hammer
- Relatives: Victor Hammer (brother); Michael Hammer (grandson); Armie Hammer (great-grandson)

Armand Hammer (May 21, 1898 – December 10, 1990) was an American oil tycoon, entrepreneur, and philanthropist.

The son of a Russian-born communist activist, Hammer trained as a physician before beginning his career in trade with the newly established Soviet Union. Having made his fortune in pharmaceuticals and whiskey, he nearly retired before coming into control of the then-failing Occidental Petroleum in 1956. He spent the next 33 years as chief executive officer and chairman of the company, overseeing its growth to become one of the largest companies in the US. Called "Lenin's chosen capitalist" by the press, he was also known for his art collection and his close ties to the Soviet Union.

Hammer's business interests around the world and his "citizen diplomacy" helped him cultivate a wide network of friends and associates.

== Early life ==
Armand Hammer was born on May 21, 1898, in New York City, to Rose (née Lipschitz) and Julius Hammer, who were Russian Jewish emigrants. Julius was born in the Jewish ghetto of Odessa in 1874. Julius' father, Jacob, was a merchant who regularly traveled between the United States and Russia. Jacob became a naturalized U.S. citizen, and so Julius was a U.S. citizen. Julius spent most of his youth in Russia before moving to the United States at the age of 16. He worked in a foundry in Branford, Connecticut, before moving to New York City's Lower East Side in 1892. There, he worked as a clerk in a drugstore, and in 1897 he met Rose at a Socialist Labor Party picnic.

The symbol of the SLP

Following the Russian Revolution, a part of the Socialist Labor Party of America (SLP) under Julius' leadership split off to become a founding element of the Communist Party USA, which supported Vladimir Lenin and Bolshevism. As the administrative head, commercial attaché, and financial advisor of the Ludwig Martens-led Russian Soviet Government Bureau, Julius Hammer was assigned to generate support for the Russian Soviet Government Bureau and funded the Soviet Russian Bureau by money laundering the proceeds from illegal sales of smuggled diamonds through his company Allied Drug, while his Allied Drug partner, Abraham A. Heller, headed the Soviet Bureau's commercial department. Julius Hammer and Heller traveled extensively across the United States to stop the embargo of Soviet Russia and to increase United States trade with Soviet Russia and improve the image of Bolsheviks, whom American socialists despised overwhelmingly. During the United States embargo against Soviet Russia, Julius Hammer used his Allied Drug and Chemical as a front to smuggle items and materials between the United States and Soviet Russia through Riga. After the Lusk Committee supported the police raid of the Soviet Russian Government Bureau on June 12, 1919, Ludwig Martens escaped and went underground, often hiding at Hammer's home. On December 18, 1920, Martens was deported; he was returned to Soviet Russia in January 1921.

Hammer said originally that his father had named him after a character, Armand Duval, in La Dame aux Camélias, a novel by Alexandre Dumas. According to other sources, Hammer later was said to be named after the "arm and hammer" graphic symbol of the SLP, in which his father had a leadership role. Late in his life, Hammer confirmed that the latter story contained the true origin of his given name.

=== Father's imprisonment ===
Due to his socialist and communist activities, Hammer's father Julius had been put under federal surveillance. On July 5, 1919, federal agents witnessed Marie Oganesoff (the 33-year-old Russian wife of a former tsarist diplomat) entering Julius's medical office located in a wing of his Bronx home. Oganesoff, "who had accumulated a life-threatening history of miscarriages, abortions, and poor health, was pregnant and wanted to terminate her pregnancy." The surgical procedure took place in the midst of a great flu epidemic. Six days after the abortion, Oganesoff died of pneumonia. Four weeks after her death, a Bronx County grand jury indicted Julius Hammer for first-degree manslaughter. The following summer, a criminal prosecutor convinced a jury that Julius Hammer had let his patient "die like a dog" and that the claims that she had actually died from complications due to influenza were mere attempts to cover up his crime. In 1920, a judge sentenced Julius Hammer to three and a half years in Sing Sing prison.

While most historians (such as Beverly Gage and Nigel West) state that Julius had performed the abortion, an opposing position has been put forward by author Edward Jay Epstein, who in his book Dossier: The Secret History of Armand Hammer puts forward the claim that it was Armand Hammer, then a medical student, rather than his father, who performed the abortion and his father Julius assumed the blame. Epstein's claims come from interview comments made by Bettye Murphy, who had been Armand's mistress. According to Murphy and Epstein's account, the legal strategy was that Julius did not deny that an abortion had been performed, but insisted that it had been medically necessary and that a licensed doctor, rather than a medical student, would be more convincing in presenting that argument.

=== Allied Drug ===
After the Soviet Russian Government Bureau closed, Allied Drug's smuggling activities between the United States and Soviet Russia ceased, which caused Allied Drug to gain enormous debts from storing large amounts of unpaid items in warehouses in New York and Riga. In March 1921, Ludwig Martens sent a letter from Moscow through the Soviet mission in Tallinn to Julius Hammer, who was imprisoned at Sing Sing until 1924, granting his Allied Drug and Chemical concessions for trade with Soviet Russia and requested an Allied Drug representative to be present in Soviet Russia.

When his father was imprisoned, Hammer and his brother took Allied Drug, the family business, to new heights, reselling equipment they had bought at depressed prices at the end of World War I. According to Hammer, his first business success was in 1919, manufacturing and selling a ginger extract, which legally contained high levels of alcohol. This was extremely popular during Prohibition, and the company had $1 million in sales that year.

=== Family envoy in Soviet Union ===
While Julius was imprisoned, he sent Armand Hammer, who could not speak any Russian, to the Soviet Union to look after the affairs of Allied Drug and Chemical. Hammer traveled back and forth from the Soviet Union for the next 10 years. In the meantime, Hammer graduated from Columbia College in 1919 and received his medical degree from the Columbia College of Physicians and Surgeons in 1921.

In 1921, while waiting for his internship to begin at Bellevue Hospital, Hammer went to the Soviet Union for a trip that lasted until late 1930. Although his career in medicine was cut short, he relished being referred to as "Dr. Hammer". Hammer's intentions in the 1921 trip have been debated ever since. He has claimed that he originally intended to recoup $150,000 in debts for drugs shipped during the Allied intervention, but was soon moved by a capitalistic and philanthropic interest in selling wheat to the then-starving Russians. In his passport application, Hammer stated that he intended to visit only Western Europe. J. Edgar Hoover in the Justice Department knew this was false, but Hammer was allowed to travel, anyway. The 26-year-old Hoover, who was the Justice Department's expert on subversives, was tipped off that Armand Hammer was a courier for the COMINTERN and ensured that foreign intelligence agencies were notified of Armand Hammer's travels. A skeptical U.S. government watched him through this trip and for the rest of his life.

== Career ==
=== Early Soviet ventures ===
==== First trip to Russia ====
After leaving Columbia Medical School, Hammer extended earlier entrepreneurial ventures with a successful business importing many goods from and exporting pharmaceuticals to the newly formed Soviet Union, together with his younger brother Victor. The blockade of Soviet Russia had ended for most items in February 1921, and on July 5, 1921, he departed New York on his first trip to Soviet Russia as Allied Drug's representative in Soviet Russia. Prior to his departure, he visited Charles Recht, Lenin's United States attorney that supported Soviet Russia's best interests in the United States and whose law office was in the same building that the former Soviet Russian Government Bureau had occupied, and Recht gave Hammer a package to deliver to Ludwig Martens in Moscow. During this first visit, Armand Hammer allowed the Cheka, the Soviet secret police who later became known as the KGB, to take control of Allied Drug and Chemical.

==== Asbestos concession ====
During his time in Soviet Russia and later the Soviet Union, he perfected bribery and money-laundering techniques, which were exposed later in the 1960s and 1970s during which he tape-recorded his payoffs. After returning to the United States, Hammer stated that Lenin had granted him an asbestos concession for 25 years to mine asbestos from the Urals in Soviet Russia. According to Hammer, on his initial trip, he took $60,000 in medical supplies to aid in a typhus epidemic and made a deal with Lenin for furs, caviar, and jewelry expropriated by the Soviet state in exchange for a million bushels (27,216 tons) shipment of surplus American wheat.

==== Lenin New Economic Policy ====
During Lenin's New Economic Policy, Armand Hammer became the mediator for 38 international companies in their dealings with the USSR. Before Lenin's death, Hammer negotiated the import of Fordson tractors into the USSR, which served a major role in agricultural mechanization in the country. Later, after Stalin came to power, additional deals were negotiated with Hammer as an American–Soviet negotiator.

==== Hammer's move to Soviet Union ====
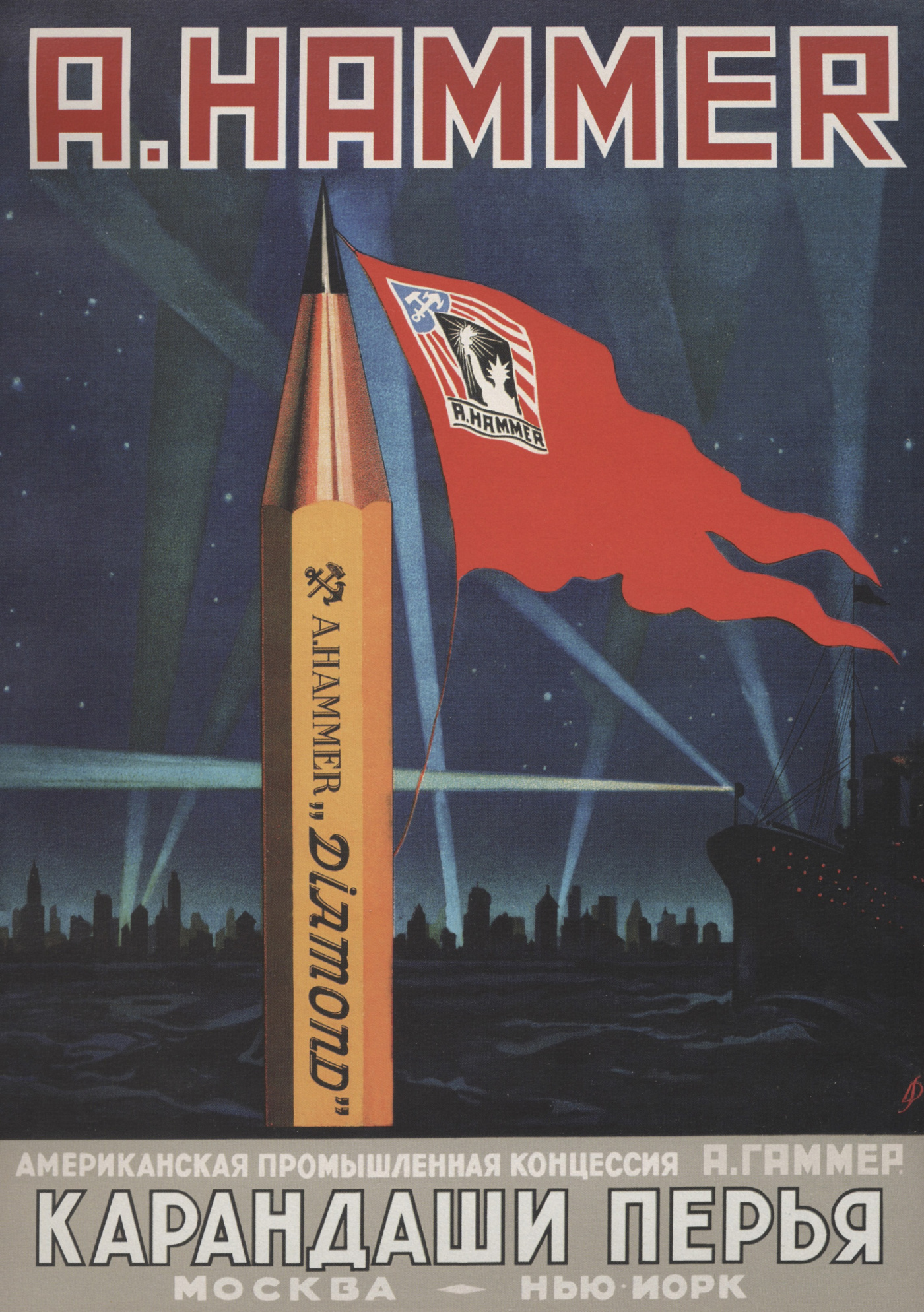
Advertisement of Hammer's stationery concession, 1928

He moved to the USSR in the 1920s to oversee these operations, especially his large business manufacturing and exporting pens and pencils. According to Alexander Barmine, who was assigned by the Central Committee to run the Mezhdunarodnaya Kniga company to compete with Hammer, the stationery concession to produce such items in the Soviet Union was actually granted to Julius Hammer. Barmine states the party spent five million gold rubles on stationery supplies made in factories controlled by Julius Hammer and other concessionaires, making them rich. Barmine further contends that the Soviets were eventually able to duplicate certain items such as typewriter parts and pens, and end those concessions, but were never able to match the quality of Hammer's pencils, so that concession became permanent. Armand Hammer remained in the Soviet Union until 1930.

=== Return to the United States ===
Back in the United States, Hammer was sold a few Fabergé eggs by the Soviets between 1930 and 1933. The authenticity of the artifacts was questioned. According to Géza von Habsburg, Armand's brother Victor Hammer stated Stalin's trade commissar Anastas Mikoyan provided Fabergé hallmarking tools to Armand to sell fakes, and Victor stated a 1938 New York sale he ran with Armand, which grossed several million dollars, consisted of both authentic and inauthentic items (called Fauxbergé by Habsburg), with commissions going back to Mikoyan. Although certainly some fakes were produced, on close examination many of the so-called fake items turned out to actually be from various workshops, particularly that of Henrik Wigstrom, and had been appropriated by the Soviet government when they closed the Faberge company. As the items were either unfinished or not ready for retail sale, many were not hallmarked, so Hammer and his associates finished the work.

In his 1983 book, Red Carpet, author Joseph Finder discusses Hammer's "extensive involvement with Russia." In Dossier: The Secret History of Armand Hammer, Edward Jay Epstein called Hammer "a virtual spy" for the Soviet Union.

=== Oil company, Libya deals, and return to Soviet negotiation ===
After returning to the US, Hammer entered into a diverse array of business, art, cultural, and humanitarian endeavors, including investing in various U.S. oil-production efforts.

He gained enormous wealth through his United Distillers of America, which was a 1933 established firm known as the A. Hammer Cooperage Corporation until 1946, when it changed its name to United Distillers of America Ltd. In early 1944, Hammer purchased American Distilling Co. and a former New Market, New Hampshire, rum distillery at which his American Distilling employee, Dr. Hanns G. Maister, began producing the first United States-made potato-based spirit, which was a vodka, and also produced a blended whiskey that was retailed through the cooperage's account with West Shore. After a B-25 plane crashed into the north face of the 79th floor of the Empire State Building on a foggy Saturday July 28, 1945, Hammer purchased the damaged 78th floor, refurbished it, and made it the headquarters of his United Distillers of America.

His oil investments were later parlayed into control of Occidental Petroleum (Oxy) which he obtained in 1956. Through his Occidental Petroleum and its stakes in Libya, Hammer was pivotal in breaking the tight grip that the major United States domestic producers had on the price of oil, and instead gave OPEC control over oil prices. Arthur Andersen was Oxy's auditor. National Geographic described Occidental chairman Hammer as "a pioneer in the synfuels boom."

In 1973, Libya nationalized 51% of Oxy's holdings in Libya. In 1974, Armand Hammer announced a 35-year oil exploration agreement with Libya, the first such agreement signed by Libya after Muammar Gaddafi came to power in September 1969. By the 1974 deal, 81% of the oil extracted by Occidental Petroleum was going to the Libyan government, with only 19% retained by Occidental Petroleum. At the time, Oxy was the second largest producer of oil in Libya, and Libya was the company's only major source of crude. The Libyan government continually threatened the assets of the company, who would usually give in to Gaddafi's demands.

Throughout his life Hammer continued personal and business dealings with the Soviet Union, despite the Cold War. In later years, he lobbied and traveled extensively at a great personal expense, working for peace between the United States and the Communist countries of the world, including ferrying physicians and supplies into the Soviet Union to help Chernobyl survivors. In his book The Prize, Daniel Yergin writes that Hammer "ended up as a go-between for five Soviet General Secretaries and seven U.S. Presidents."

=== Détente ===
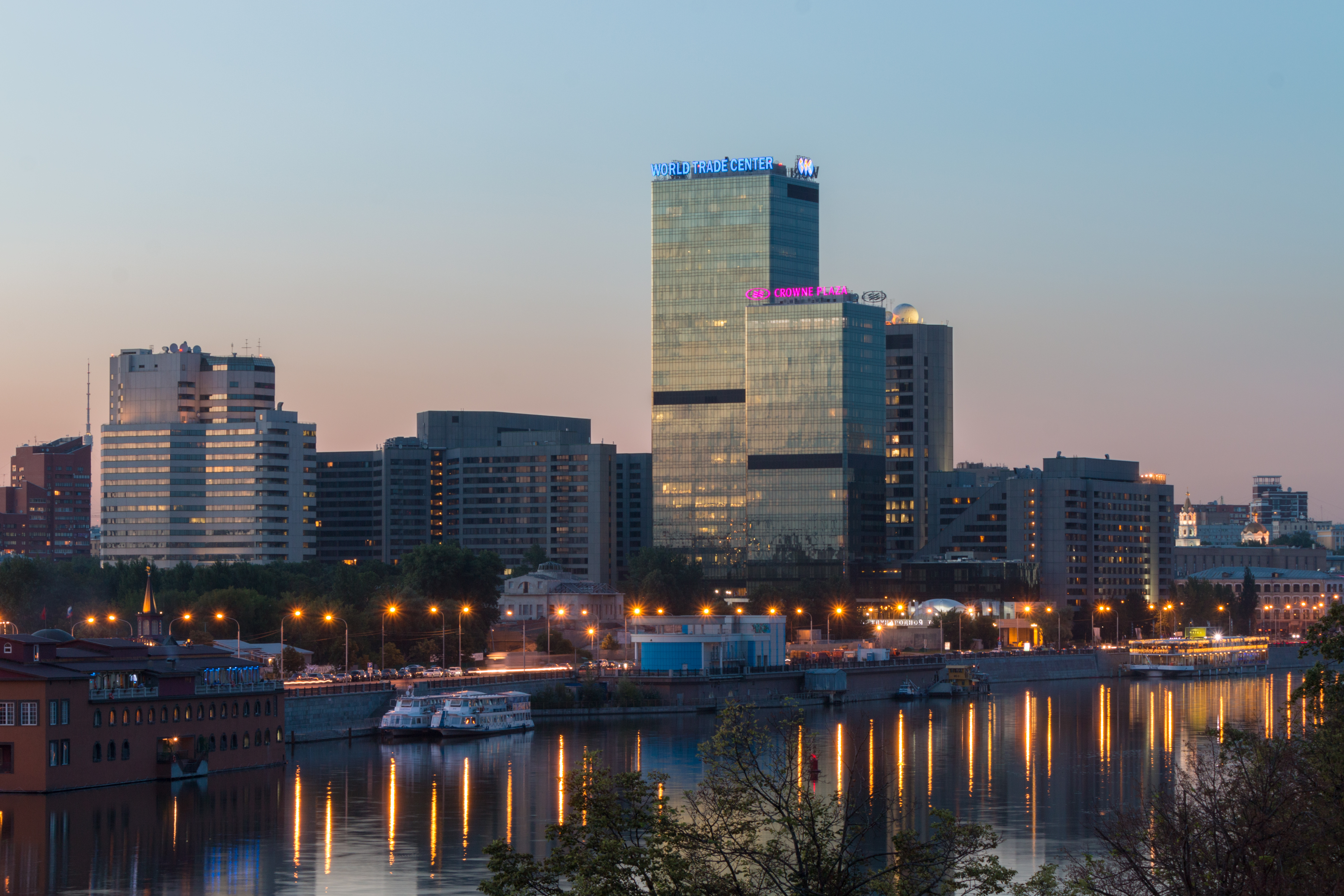
The Hammer Center (formerly the World Trade Center Moscow).

Through Hammer's closeness to Yuri Andropov, Andropov assigned Mikhail Ilyich Bruk (Russian: Михаил Ильич Брук; 1923 Moscow – 2009 Jurmala) also called Mike or Michael Brook or Brooke, who was an English-Russian translator, as Hammer's personal ambassador and expediter and was present as Hammer's translator at all meetings between Armand Hammer and Soviet leaders in the Soviet Union beginning in 1964. Bruk had been a technical translator at the first Pugwash conference called the Thinkers' Lodge held in July 1957. According to Armand Hammer, "Mike's KGB."

In early 1969, Armand Hammer obtained control of Eaton's Tower International (Note: In 1954 during the United States' McCarthyism era and to affect the trading of sheet metal from Cyrus Eaton's Republic Steel in Cleveland for chrome ore primarily from the Kazakh SSR in the Soviet Union, Eaton's son Cyrus Eaton Jr., established the Canadian firm Tower International in Montreal to act as an intermediary because direct trade between the United States and the Soviet Union was unthinkable.) through which Hammer would have a controlling majority stake in Tower International in exchange for Hammer's Occidental Petroleum assuming the debts of Tower International and Eaton receiving 45% of any profits from Tower International's future projects. (Note: Later, during the 1980s perestroika, Cyrus Eaton World Trade Ltd. contributed to the opening up of trade between the Soviet Union and Canada.) (Note: In July 1972, Armand Hammer's financial wizard Dorman Commons, who was the chief financial officer at Hammer's Occidental Petroleum in Los Angeles, estimated that Tower International's International Trade Center project in Moscow would cost $100 million and would be a complete flop if détente failed. On July 31, 1972, Commons voiced his thoughts with Hammer after which Hammer fired Commons effective August 1, 1972.)

During Soviet times Armand Hammer also financed the World Trade Center Moscow, which opened in 1979 and became known as the Hammer Center.

==== Trade deals between Nixon and Brezhnev ====
After Richard Nixon, as the first United States President to visit the Soviet Union, traveled to Moscow for a summit that ended on June 1, 1972, Hammer traveled to Moscow arriving July 14, 1972, (Note: During this trip which Mike Brook organized, Hammer was the first person to fly to the Soviet Union in a privately owned airplane, his Gulfstream jet, and did not go through the typical passport and customs checks.) and, with Sargent Shriver as his legal advisor, negotiated the first trade agreement between the United States and the Soviet Union following Nixon's summit. Six weeks prior to Nixon's departure, Hammer personally gave Maurice Stans, the finance chairman of Nixon's campaign fund, $46,000 in cash from a numbered bank account in Switzerland which Hammer used as his slush fund money. Later, in September 1972 Hammer gave Nixon's campaign fund an additional $54,000 from the same Swiss bank account amounting to a total of $100,000 that Hammer donated to Nixon's campaign fund. On July 18, 1972, Hammer returned to the United States through London and called Tim Babcock, Hammer's lobbyist for the Nixon administration, to have him arrange a meeting with Nixon through H. R. Haldeman, who was Nixon's chief of staff, in order to debrief the President about Hammer's trade deal which occurred on July 20, 1972.

During détente in July 1972, Armand Hammer negotiated a twenty-year agreement through Leonid Kostandov, who was a close friend of Hammer and was the Minister of the Chemical Industry in the USSR from October 1965 to 1980, with Leonid Brezhnev of the Soviet Union that was signed by Hammer in April 1973 in which the Hammer-controlled firms Occidental Petroleum and Tower International would export to the Soviet Union, and later Russia, phosphate, which Occidental mined in northern Florida, in return for the Soviet Union, and later Russia, exporting from Odessa through Hammer's firms natural gas that would be converted into ammonia, potash, and urea. This fertilizer deal was to continue until Hammer's 100th birthday in 1998. JaxPort at the Port of Jacksonville in Jacksonville, Florida, was the United States port through which this trade occurred. Nixon encouraged the Export–Import Bank to finance in part the deal, valued at $20 billion over 20 years, and fund the Soviet construction of four ammonia plants in the greater Volga region, and a pipeline connecting them to the port at Odessa.

On July 27, 1978, the fertilizer deal began functioning in the Ukrainian SSR, Soviet Union, with the opening of the port and the Odessa plants near the former location of Grigorievka (Russian: Григорьевка, Ukrainian: Григорівка) at the seaport "Pivdenny" (Russian: Морской порт “Пивденный”, Ukrainian: Морський торговельний порт «Південний»), which is the deepest port in Ukraine servicing vessels with drafts up to 18.5 metres (61 ft). Pivdenny is located at the Small Adzhalyk Estuary west of the 1974 established Yuzhne. The Port of Pivdenny was known as "Grigorievsky" (Russian: «Григорьевский») until 1978 and as the Port of Yuzhne from 1978 until April 17, 2019, when the port was renamed from the Russian word to the Ukrainian word for southern.

=== Illegal financial support of Nixon's Watergate fund ===
Politically, Hammer was a Democrat; but according to the memoir of his lawyer Louis Nizer, he was also one of "many executives who contribute to both political parties [and] preferred no publicity about his dual gifts." In 1972, "under pressure" from various sources, Hammer donated an unusual amount to Nixon's second campaign: "He wished his substantial contribution to Nixon to be anonymous because he himself was a Democrat." Hammer anonymously gave $46,000 to support Nixon before a 1971 law took effect on April 7, 1972, which banned political contributions both anonymous and through another person. Later, in September 1972, Armand Hammer made an additional three illegal contributions totaling $54,000 to Richard Nixon's Watergate fund through friends of former Montana Governor Tim Babcock, who was Hammer's vice president of Occidental Petroleum, after which both Hammer and Babcock pleaded guilty to charges involving illegal contributions. Hammer received probation and a $3,000 fine. In August 1989, US President George H. W. Bush pardoned Hammer for the illegal contributions to aid Nixon's re-election in 1972.

=== Association with the Gore family ===
A 2003 interview with Aleksey Mitrofanov erroneously places the Hammer and Gore families close to each other in Europe. Occidental's coal interests were represented for many years by attorney and former U.S. Senator Al Gore Sr., among others. Gore, who had a longtime close friendship with Hammer, became the head of the subsidiary Island Creek Coal Company, upon his election loss in the Senate in November 1970. Much of Occidental's coal and phosphate production was in Tennessee, the state Gore represented in the Senate, and Gore owned shares in the company. (Note: Occidental held large phosphate reserves near Jacksonville, Florida.) Former Vice President Al Gore Jr. received much criticism from environmentalists, when the shares passed to the estate after the death of Gore Sr., and Gore Jr. was a son and the executor of the estate. Gore Jr. did not exercise control over the shares, which were eventually sold when the estate closed.

Hammer was very fond of Gore Jr. and, in 1984, under Hammer's guidance, Gore Jr. sought Tennessee's Senate office previously held by Howard Baker. Hammer supposedly promised Gore Sr. that he could make his son the president of the United States. It was under Hammer's encouragement and support that Gore Jr. sought the Democratic Party presidential nomination in 1988.

=== Stake in Arm & Hammer ===
In the 1980s Hammer owned a considerable amount of stock in Church & Dwight, the company that manufactures Arm & Hammer products; he also served on its board of directors. However, the Arm & Hammer company's brand name did not originate with Armand Hammer. It was in use 31 years before Hammer was born. While Hammer and Occidental said that the Church & Dwight investment was a coincidence, Hammer acknowledged previously trying to buy the Arm & Hammer brand as a result of often being asked about it.

=== President's Cancer Panel ===
In 1981, Hammer was appointed by US President Ronald Reagan to serve on the three-member President's Cancer Panel. He was chairman of that panel from 1984 to 1989. As chairman, he announced a campaign to raise $1 billion a year to fight cancer.

== Other activities and pursuits ==
Hammer was a philanthropist, supporting causes related to education, medicine, and the arts. He was a collector of Impressionist and Post-Impressionist paintings. His personal donation forms the core of the permanent collection of the UCLA Hammer Museum in Los Angeles, California. Together with his brother Victor, he was the owner of the "Hammer Galleries" in New York City. Hammer purchased Knoedler, the oldest art gallery in America, in 1971. Hammer hired art historian John Richardson as director at Knoedler; Richardson later wrote an unflattering portrait of him, calling Hammer "a veteran con man".

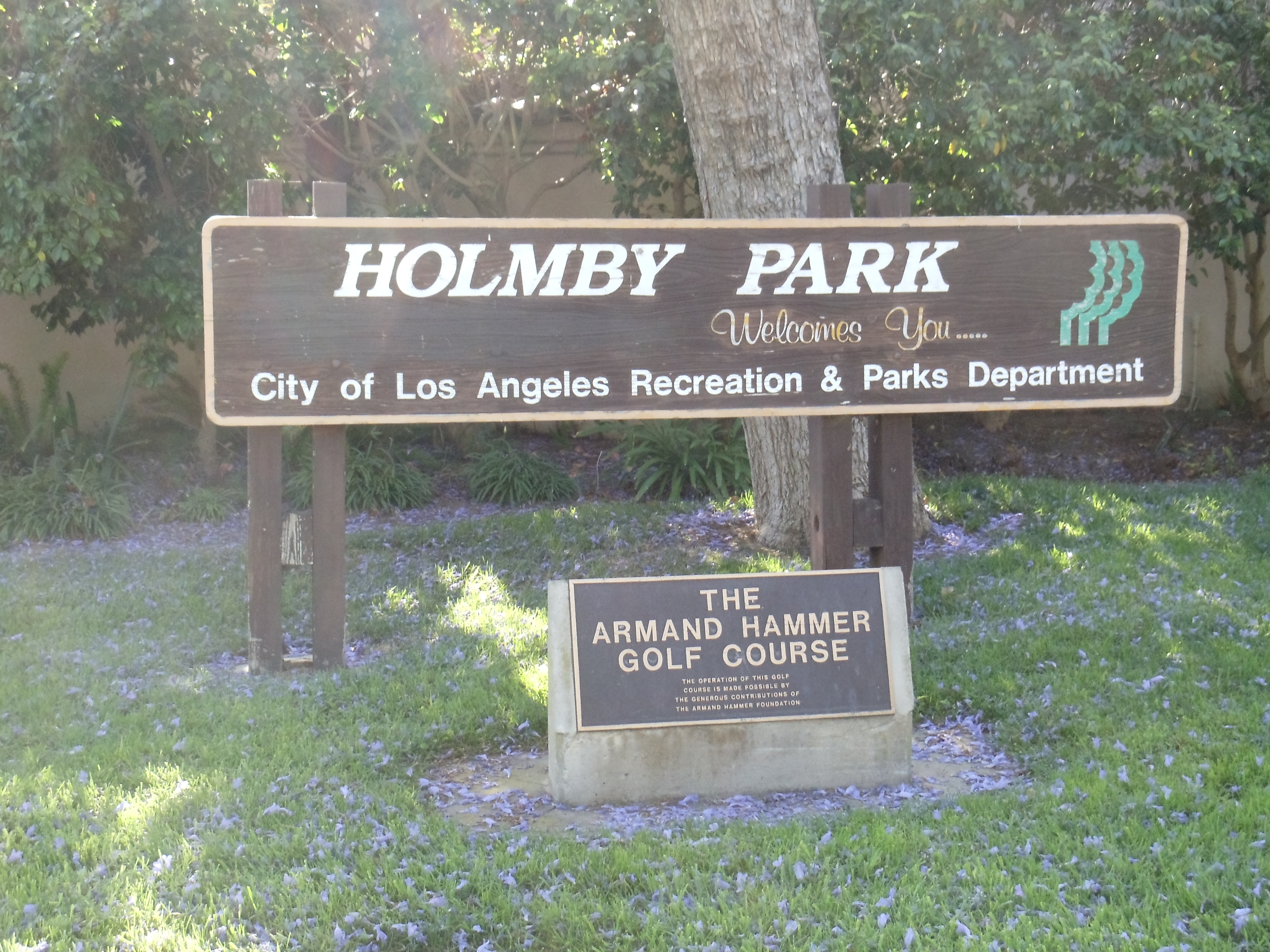
Sign of the Armand Hammer Golf Course in Holmby Park in Holmby Hills, Los Angeles

Among his legacies is the Armand Hammer United World College of the American West (now generally called the UWC-USA, part of the United World Colleges), which he helped found in 1981, with the support of the then-Prince of Wales, Charles, who was president of United World Colleges International. Due to his closeness to the future Charles III, he was figuratively called a godfather to one of the Prince's children. It has been reported that Charles intended to make Hammer Prince William's godfather but was forced to abandon these plans as Princess Diana disliked the idea. In the 1980s, Hammer gave strong financial support to Prince Charles's projects of nearly 40 million pounds and free use of Hammer's Boeing 727.

Together with his friends Harry and Rosa Strygler, he also supported several Jewish foundations, particularly those associated with the Holocaust. Hammer hungered for a Nobel Peace Prize, and he was repeatedly nominated for one, including by Menachem Begin, but never won.

In New Jersey, Hammer raised Aberdeen Angus cattle at Shadow Isle Farm in Colts Neck. He owned the property, which included Colts Neck Airport, for about 30 years, and sold its 420 acres in 1982 for $1.2 million.

In 1986, Forbes magazine estimated his net worth at $200 million.

Hammer made a guest appearance on a 1988 episode of The Cosby Show (as the grandfather of a friend of Theo Huxtable's who was suffering from cancer), saying that a cure for cancer was imminent.

Hammer was leading Occidental in 1988 when its oil rig, Piper Alpha, exploded, killing 167 men. The Cullen Report highlighted failings in many areas on the platform.

As of 2016, he has been the subject of six biographies: in 1975 (Considine, authorized biography), 1985 (Bryson, coffee table book), Weinberg 1989, Blumay 1992, Epstein 1996, and Alef 2009; and two autobiographies (1932 and a bestseller in 1987). His art collection, The Armand Hammer Collection: Four Centuries of Masterpieces, published by the Armand Hammer Foundation in multiple editions, eventually became five centuries of masterpieces, sometimes in conjunction with museums where the collection was displayed. and his philanthropic projects were the subject of numerous publications.

== Awards ==
In 1978, Hammer, as a non-citizen of the Soviet Union, received the Soviet Union's award the Order of Friendship of Peoples from Leonid Brezhnev because of his strong support of both the International Workers and Communist movement and the needs of the Soviet Union. By the time of his death, Hammer had received other awards, including:

- Golden Plate Award of the American Academy of Achievement (1978)
- US: National Medal of Arts (1987)
- France: Legion of Honor
- Italy: Grand Officer of the Order of Merit of the Italian Republic (August 1, 1981)
- Sweden: Royal Order of the Polar Star
- Austria: Knight Commander's Cross
- Pakistan: Hilal-i-Quaid-Azam Peace Award
- Israel: Leadership Award
- Venezuela: Order of Andrés Bello
- Mexico: National Recognition Award
- Bulgaria: Jubilee Medal
- Belgium: Order of the Crown.
- John Jay Award (1981) from Columbia College, his alma mater

== Personal life ==
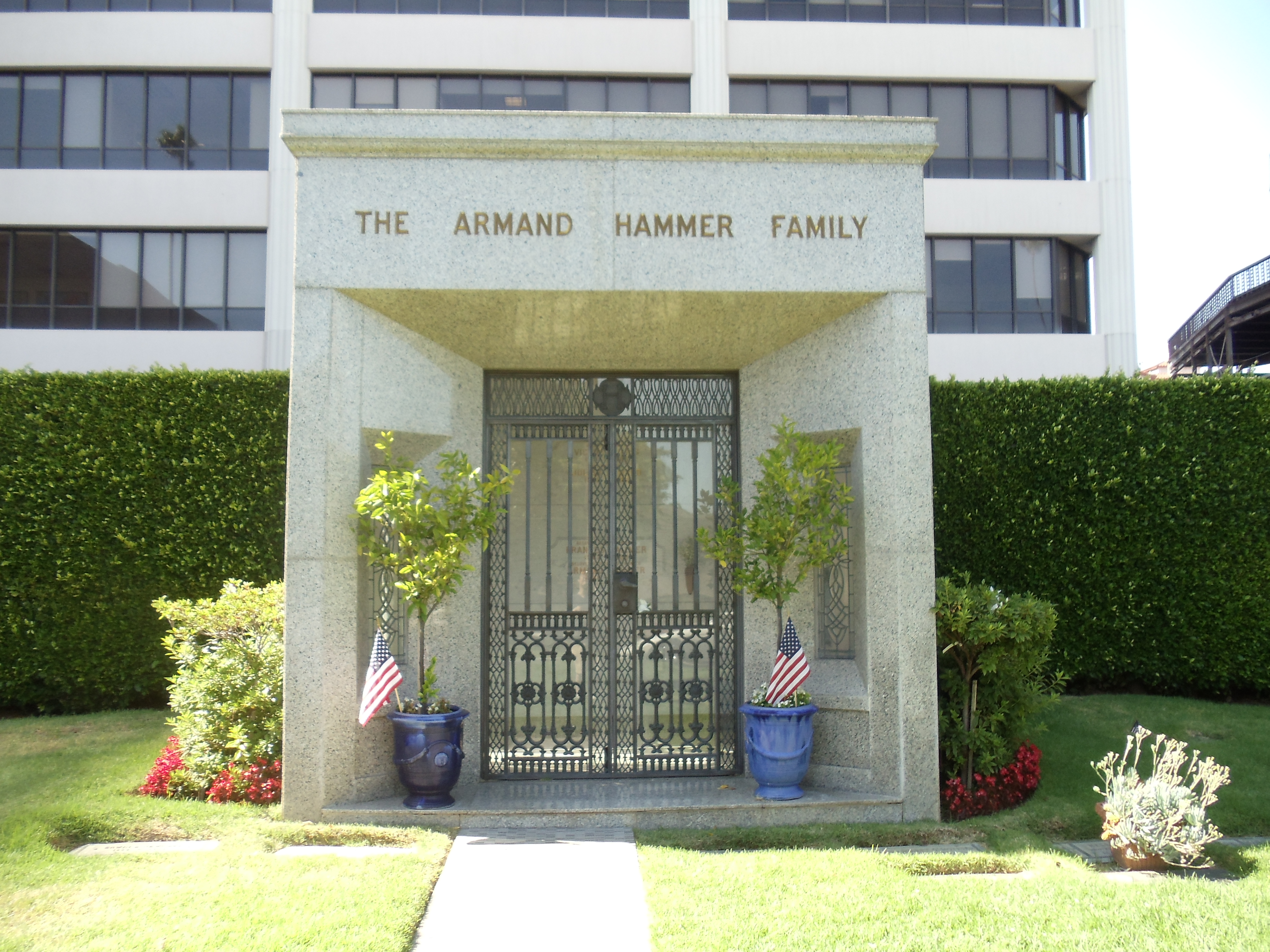
Family tomb in Westwood Village Memorial Park Cemetery

Hammer was the middle of three sons. He had close relationships, including in business, with his brothers, Harry and Victor Hammer, throughout their lives.

Hammer married three times. In 1927, Hammer married a Russian actress, Olga Vadimovna von Root, who was the daughter of a czarist general. In 1943, he married Angela Zevely. In 1956, he married the wealthy widow Frances Barrett, and they remained married until her death in 1989.

Hammer had one son, Julian Armand Hammer, by his first wife. Hammer's grandson is businessman Michael Armand Hammer; his great-grandson is actor Armie Hammer.

Hammer died of bone marrow cancer in December 1990, aged 92 in Los Angeles. He is buried in Westwood Village Memorial Park Cemetery, across the street from the Occidental Petroleum headquarters on Wilshire Boulevard.

== Publications ==
Articles

- "On a Vast China Market." Journal of International Affairs, vol. 39, no. 2: China in Transition (Winter 1986): 19–25. JSTOR 24356572.

Books

- The Quest of the Romanoff Treasure. William Farquhar Payson (1932). 241 pages.
- Hammer. Los Angeles: Perigee Books, 1988. Co-authored by Neil Lyndon.
  - Reviewed by Tom Gainor, VP of Federal Reserve Bank of Minneapolis. "Hammer: Odyssey of an Entrepreneur", The Region, August 1987.

== See also ==
- Cyrus S. Eaton
- Fauxbergé
- List of people pardoned or granted clemency by the president of the United States
