= Gloria Allred =

American attorney (born 1941)

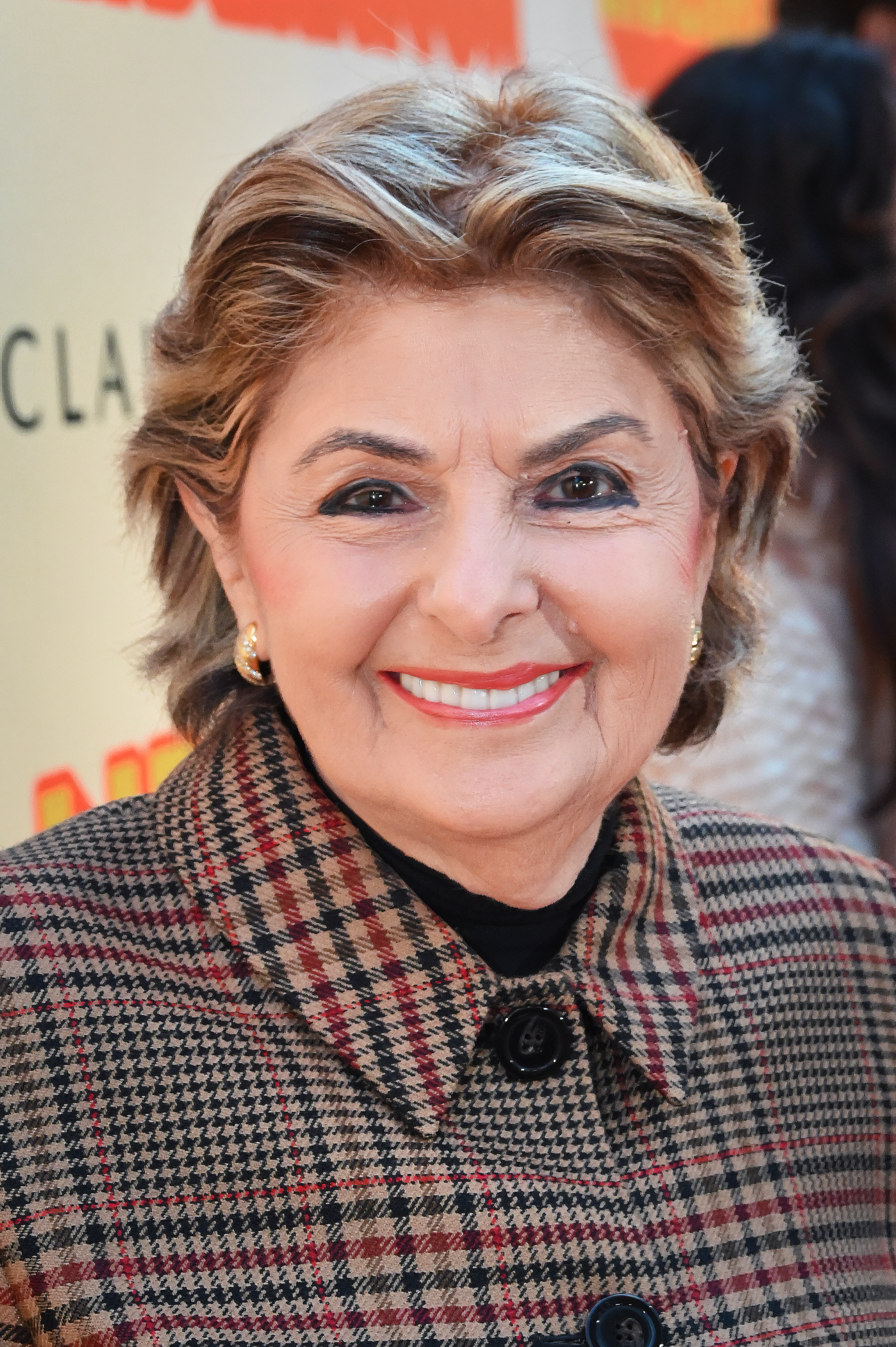
- Allred in 2025
- Born: Gloria Rachel Bloom; July 3, 1941 (age 85); Philadelphia, Pennsylvania, U.S.
- Education: University of Pennsylvania (BA); New York University (MA); Southwestern Law School (attended); Loyola Marymount University (JD)
- Occupations: Attorney; human rights activist
- Employer(s): Allred, Maroko & Goldberg
- Political party: Democratic
- Spouses: Peyton Huddleston Bray Jr. (m. 1960; div. 1962) William Allred (m. 1968; div. 1987)
- Children: Lisa Bloom
- Website: gloriaallred.com

Gloria Rachel Allred (née Bloom; born July 3, 1941) is an American attorney known for taking high-profile and often controversial cases, particularly those involving feminist causes. She has been inducted into the National Women's Hall of Fame.

== Early life and education ==
Gloria Rachel Bloom was born in Philadelphia, Pennsylvania, into a Jewish working-class family on July 3, 1941. Her father, Morris, worked as a salesman; her British-born mother, Stella, stayed at home and raised her child. After graduating from the Philadelphia High School for Girls, she attended the University of Pennsylvania in Philadelphia, where she met her first husband, Peyton Huddleston Bray Jr. The couple had their only child, Lisa Bloom, on September 20, 1961, and divorced shortly after. Bloom is also an attorney and is best known as a former Court TV anchor.

Gloria Bloom moved back in with her parents and continued her education. In 1963, she earned a bachelor's degree in English, graduating with honors. Over strong objections from her professor, she wrote her honors thesis on black writers. She was employed in a number of occupations before she decided to become a teacher, taking a position at Benjamin Franklin High School. She began work on a graduate degree at New York University, in New York, NY, where she became interested in the civil rights movement. After earning a master's degree, she became a teacher and, in 1966, moved to Los Angeles, where she resided in Watts. She worked for the Los Angeles Teachers Association and taught at Jordan High School and Fremont High School.

In her autobiography she alleged how, during a vacation in Acapulco in 1966, she was raped at gunpoint. She discovered she was pregnant and sought an abortion. Abortion was illegal at the time, so Allred had a back-alley abortion. After undergoing the procedure, she began hemorrhaging and became infected, only recovering after being hospitalized. She did not report the rape, she said, because she did not think anyone would believe her.

In 1968, she married William Allred. She enrolled in Southwestern University School of Law and later transferred to Loyola University School of Law at the Loyola Marymount University in Los Angeles. Allred graduated and was admitted to the State Bar of California in 1975. Allred divorced her husband in 1987, retaining her married name.

== Career ==
=== Legal ===
In a legal career that has spanned five decades, Allred has represented a wide variety of clients in civil rights suits that have involved sexual harassment, women's rights, wrongful termination, and employment discrimination. The New Republic has called her "a longtime master of the press conference". She often takes high-profile cases, using press conferences and appearances on television to much effect. Allred has represented many clients in suits against celebrities, including those against Mötley Crüe drummer Tommy Lee, Arnold Schwarzenegger, Herman Cain, David Boreanaz, Scott Lee Cohen, Anthony Weiner, Sacha Baron Cohen, Esai Morales, Roman Polanski, Josh Giddey, and R. Kelly.

==== 1970s and 1980s ====
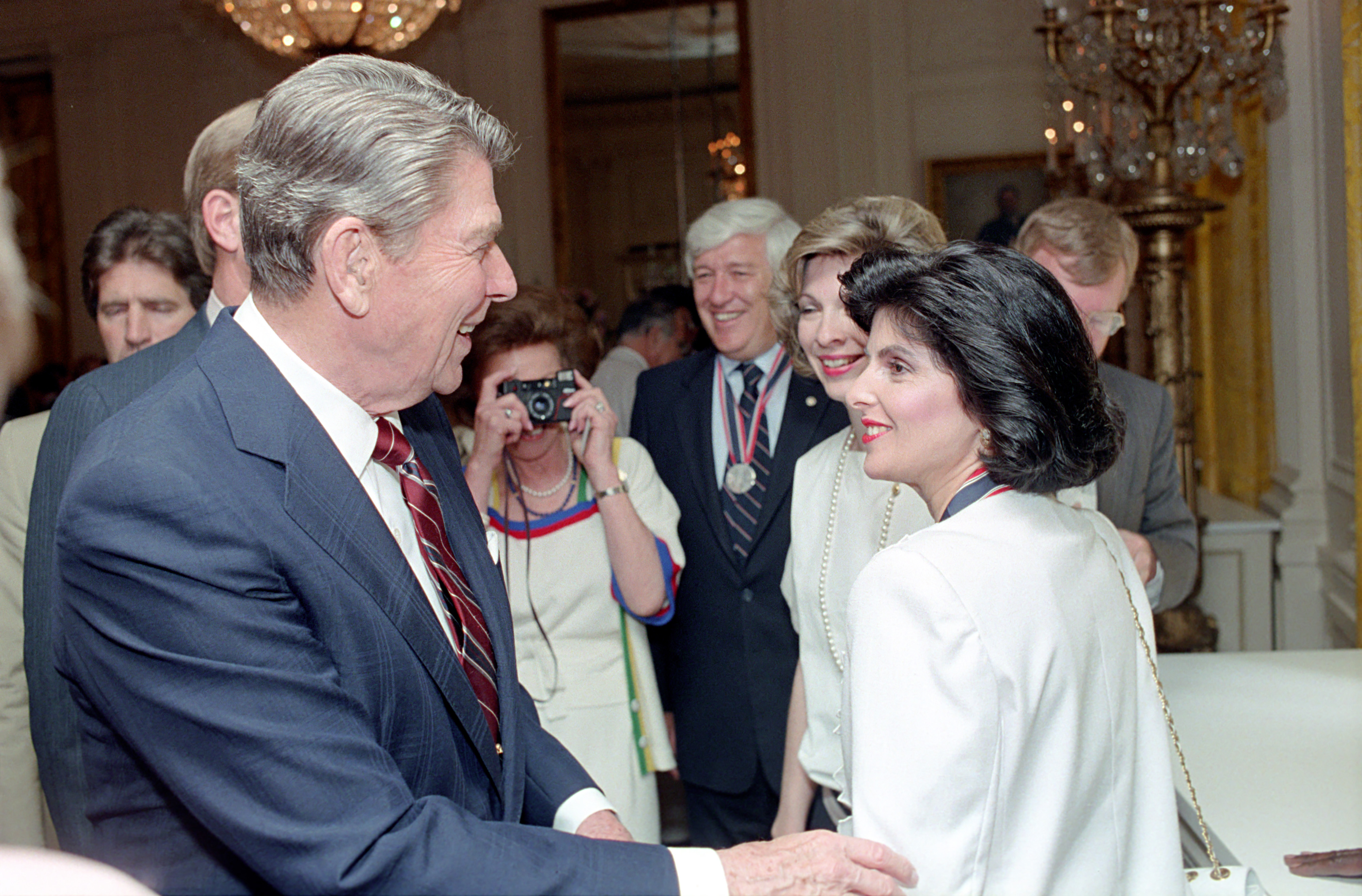
Allred with President Ronald Reagan in 1986

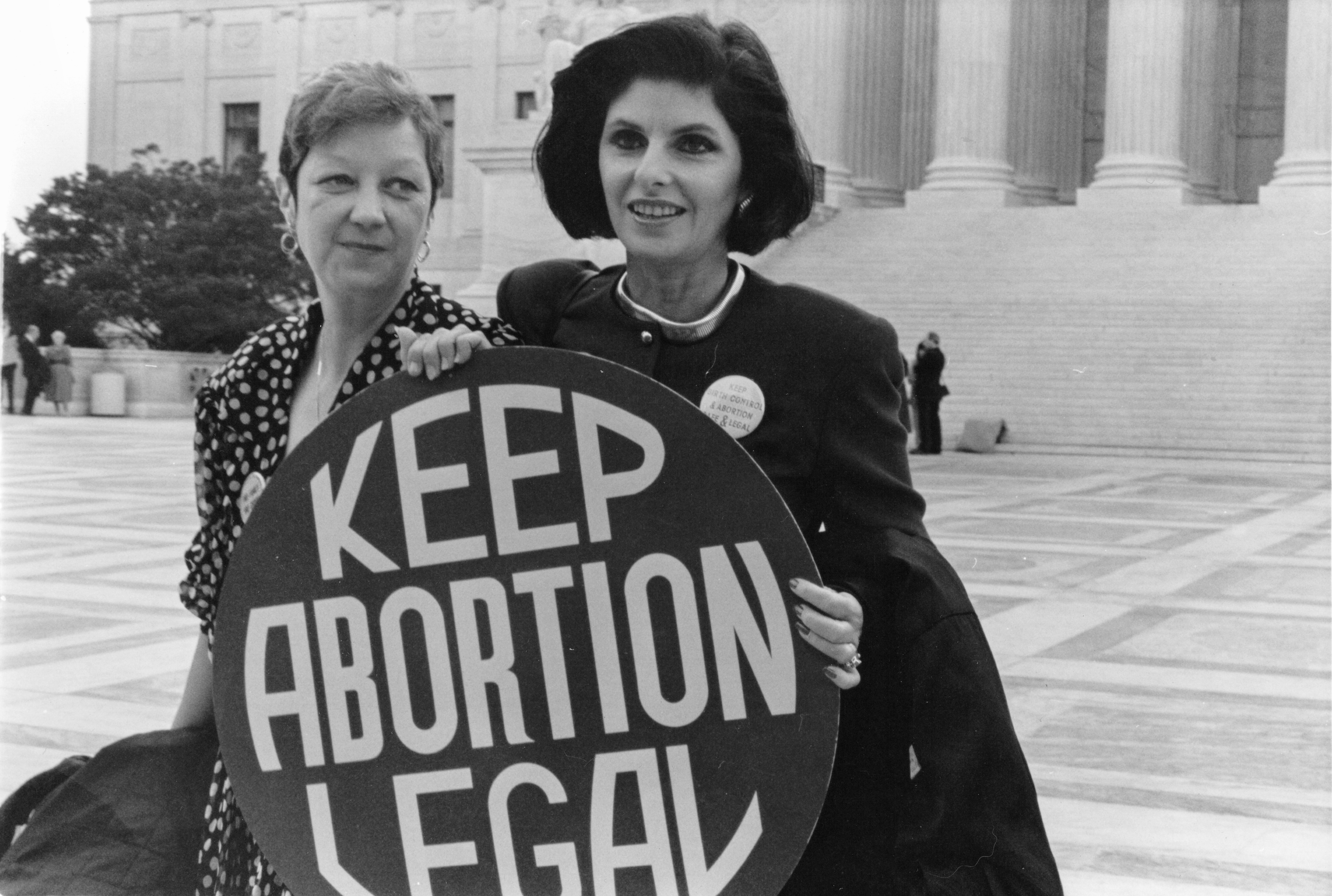
Allred (right) with client Norma McCorvey ("Jane Roe" in Roe v. Wade), 1989

Allred founded the firm Allred, Maroko, & Goldberg with fellow Loyola graduates Michael Maroko and Nathan Goldberg in January 1976. In 1979, Allred represented seven children and their parents in a lawsuit against the Sav-On Drugstore chain to stop the store from designating separate sections for boys' and girls' toys. In 1981, while California State Senator John G. Schmitz was presiding over hearings on outlawing abortion, Allred presented him with a chastity belt. Schmitz retaliated in a press release, calling her a "slick butch lawyeress". She sued him for libel, and eventually secured a settlement of $20,000 and an apology.

In 1985, Allred, along with Catharine MacKinnon, drafted a version of the Antipornography Civil Rights Ordinance for Los Angeles County. The legislation failed to pass the Los Angeles County Board of Supervisors. In 1987, Allred took on the then all-male Friars Club of Beverly Hills, an exclusive private club, over its membership discrimination policies. The Friars Club eventually allowed Allred and five other women to use the club's health facilities, after Allred displayed early skills in effective use of the media.

==== 1990s ====
Allred wrote a letter to the Senate Ethics Committee in 1992 asking them to investigate the actions of Oregon Senator Bob Packwood, who had been the subject of a newspaper article that detailed his history of sexual harassment. She kept pressure on the Committee and urged Packwood to release his diaries. The Committee eventually voted for his expulsion, and he resigned.

In 1983, Allred represented lesbian activists Deborah Johnson and Zandra Rolón in their lawsuit against the owner of a Los Angeles restaurant, Papa Choux, after he denied them service in a booth reserved for "romantic couples". While the lower court denied the two an injunction based on unlawful discrimination, the appellate court reversed the decision in Rolon v. Kulwitzky (1984), finding that the restaurant's behavior was discrimination prohibited under the Los Angeles Municipal Code. Rather than serve LGBT couples, the restaurant decided to eliminate the booths altogether, and took out newspaper ads inviting the public to a "Wake for Romance" event.

In 1995, Allred represented 11-year-old Katrina Yeaw in Yeaw v. Boy Scouts of America, a suit against the Boy Scouts of America to determine whether the organization had the right to exclude girls from membership. That same year, she represented Nicole Brown Simpson's family during the O. J. Simpson murder trial. In August 1997, she represented model Kelly Fisher when she sued Dodi Fayed for allegedly breaking off their engagement to begin his highly publicized relationship with Diana, Princess of Wales. The suit was dropped not long after Diana and Fayed died in Paris that August.

Allred represented Melrose Place actress Hunter Tylo in 1997 when producer Aaron Spelling fired her because she was pregnant. A jury awarded Tylo $4.8 million. The case was important in establishing the rights of actors to continue work if they become pregnant.

==== 2000s ====
After pop singer Michael Jackson held his son over a hotel balcony in Berlin in 2002, Allred wrote a letter to California's Child Protective Services, asking for an investigation into the safety of Jackson's children, and spoke on CNN about the subject. She also briefly represented Jordan Chandler in 1993 whose father had accused Jackson of sexual abuse. Allred also represented 18-year-old Daniel Kapon, who claimed that Jackson had molested him when he was a child. The Kapon case was dismissed because Kapon's father confirmed that Kapon had never met Jackson. Jackson, who an advisor said could be a bit paranoid, reportedly kept an "enemy list" on which Allred appeared, along with Rabbi Shmuley Boteach, illusionist Uri Geller, music executive Tommy Mottola, DA Tom Sneddon, and Janet Arvizo, mother of a Jackson accuser. The source of this allegation was Dieter Wiesner whom Jackson fired and who at that time was suing him for $64 million.

Later in 2002, Allred represented the family of Gwen Araujo, a transgender teen who was brutally beaten to death when it was learned that she had been assigned male at birth.

In 2004, Allred represented Amber Frey when Frey was a witness in the criminal case against Scott Peterson for the murder of his wife Laci Peterson. On February 24, 2004, Allred and her law firm, Allred, Maroko, and Goldberg, filed the first lawsuit in California challenging the denial of marriage licenses for same-sex couples as being unconstitutional. She took the case pro bono for Robin Tyler and Diane Olson and Rev. Troy Perry and his spouse Phillip Ray De Blieck. The case went to the California Supreme Court, where on May 15, 2008, she won a decision affirming the right of same-sex couples to marry in California. She represented three former Circuit City employees on behalf of a large plaintiff class in an age discrimination lawsuit against that company after it fired 3,400 workers nationwide in April 2007.

In a March 2008 complaint against the TSA, Allred represented a client who was given pliers and told to remove her nipple rings at a Lubbock, Texas, airport. In April 2008, it was reported that she had been hired by the family of the teenager who had been beaten and filmed by eight Florida teenagers. She also appeared on Today with Jessica Gibson, who was counter-suing Rob Lowe for sexual harassment.

On July 30, 2008, Allred filed a complaint with federal regulators against Downey Savings and Loan Association regarding check-cashing procedures. Marc Retmier, a 19-year-old US Navy Hospitalman, was killed in action in Afghanistan in June 2008. Downey Savings refused to immediately cash his family's military bereavement checks, and family members were compelled to seek funding elsewhere to pay for his funeral services.

In May 2009, Allred filed a suit arguing that Nadya Suleman was exploiting her octuplets. Allred asked for a court-appointed guardian, claiming that Suleman was not properly taking their interests into consideration. In December of the same year Allred was retained by Rachel Uchitel after media sources alleged that Uchitel had been having an affair with married golfer Tiger Woods. Five years later Uchitel won a $6 million legal malpractice settlement from Allred's firm in arbitration. Allred also represented Joslyn James, a pornographic actress and Woods's alleged mistress.

==== 2010s ====
On May 14, 2010, in a news conference held at Allred's office, English actress Charlotte Lewis alleged that director Roman Polanski had sexually abused her in his Paris apartment when she was 16. In June 2010, she was hired by Debrahlee Lorenzana, a former bank employee who had drawn wide public attention after alleging that she had been fired for being too attractive. In August 2010, Allred represented Jodie Fisher, whose sexual harassment claim revealed expense-account irregularities that led to the resignation of HP CEO Mark Hurd.

Allred was visible in the 2010 California gubernatorial race, going public as the lawyer for Nicky Diaz, a former domestic worker for Republican nominee Meg Whitman. Allred contended that Whitman employed Diaz for years while knowing that Diaz was an undocumented immigrant.

On April 27, 2011, Allred appeared at a press conference with the family of Justin Quinn, who was allegedly threatened at a San Francisco Giants baseball game by Braves coach Roger McDowell. Quinn had objected to McDowell's uttering of homophobic slurs and use of a baseball bat to simulate a sex act in the presence of his daughters.

On October 18, 2011, Allred won court approval to represent nine former cocktail waitresses who were fired from their jobs at Resorts Casino Hotel in Atlantic City, New Jersey after they "did not look good enough" in new uniforms modeled after 1920s-era Flapper outfits. Resorts had sought to bar Allred from the discrimination lawsuit, arguing in court papers that her "flamboyant and headline-grabbing antics" would add nothing to the case.

On March 9, 2012, Allred called for an investigation into whether radio host Rush Limbaugh should be prosecuted in Florida under a 19th-century law against "maliciously imputing to [any woman] a want of chastity" for derogatory remarks he made regarding Sandra Fluke, who testified before House Democrats to advocate for free birth control. Allred commented: "Mr. Limbaugh targeted his attack on a young law student who was simply exercising her free speech and her right to testify before congress on a very important issue to millions of American women and he vilified her. ... He needs to face the consequences of his conduct in every way that is meaningful." Allred did not represent Fluke or have contact with her at the time of her remarks nor did the prosecutor's office respond to request for comment.

Also in 2012, Allred took on the case of Jenna Talackova, a Canadian transgender woman who was challenging her disqualification from the Miss Universe Canada pageant for not being a "naturally born" female. The Miss Universe organization ultimately reversed its decision before the case proceeded to the courts. In June 2012 Allred confirmed that she was representing a former girlfriend of Rudy Eugene, the now-deceased cannibal of the 2012 Miami cannibalism incident.

On October 4, 2013, Allred was hired by the wife of critically injured motorcyclist Edwin Mieses, who was run over by Alexian Lien during the Hollywood Stuntz gang assault. Lien ran over Mieses with his SUV while Lien was being surrounded and threatened by Mieses and his motorcycle gang on Manhattan's West Side Highway. Fellow bikers later caught up with Lien and assaulted him. Allred told the press that Mieses, who suffered spinal injuries and two broken legs, was an "innocent victim" who was trying to "defuse the situation".

As of 2015, Allred was representing at least 28 women who accuse Bill Cosby of sexual assault, sexual harassment, and/or other sexual misconduct. She also represented three women who accused Donald Trump of sexual misconduct—claims which Trump has denied, and which first arose during Trump's 2016 presidential campaign.

In 2017, former Allred client Kyle Hunter filed official complaints with both the State Bar of California and the District of Columbia Bar, alleging conflict of interest because Allred was in negotiations with CBS at the same time she was representing him in a lawsuit against CBS for employment discrimination. Allred issued a statement denying any wrongdoing and claiming the investigation was sparked by a failed extortion attempt.

On November 11, 2017, Allred held a press conference representing her client, Beverly Young Nelson, as Nelson made a statement alleging sexual assault by Roy Moore when she was 16.

In 2019, New York Times reporters Jodi Kantor and Megan Twohey discussed the ways in which Allred and her firm profited from non-disclosure agreements that they negotiated, which silenced victims of sexual misconduct through "secret settlements" and "bur[ied] allegations of sexual harassment and assault". Allred's practice negotiated non-disclosures for a victim of Harvey Weinstein, and victims of Fox News host Bill O'Reilly and Olympics gymnastics physician Larry Nassar. Allred was vocal in her dislike of a proposed 2017 California bill that would ban non-disclosure clauses in agreements that silence victims of sexual harassment or assault.

==== 2020s ====
In February 2020, Allred hired an American-style school bus to encourage Prince Andrew to respond to the FBI about the sexual misconduct allegations surrounding him. The school bus was covered with an advertisement and placed outside of Buckingham Palace, and included photographs of the Duke of York and a message urging him to answer questions surrounding the controversy.

In 2021, Allred represented several victims who accused R&B singer R. Kelly of sexually abusing them. After Kelly was convicted of sexual crimes in September 2021, Allred stated that Kelly was the worst sexual predator she had pursued in her 47-year law career.

In 2021, Allred represented Hannah Archuleta. In 2019, Dr. Phil allegedly pressured Archuleta's father to send her to the Turn-About Ranch in Utah, and at the ranch, Archuleta was allegedly groped and sexually assaulted repeatedly by a male staff member. A judge dismissed the lawsuit, and the show countersued for legal costs.

In 2022, it was revealed that Allred refused to represent Efrosina "Effie" Angelova, who had accused actor Armie Hammer of raping her and sending her disturbing text messages in January 2021, after she "wouldn't sign a declaration under perjury [regarding] her accusations.". Angelova, said in 2025 that Allred discussed her case publicly with the makers of a documentary film on Hammer even after she had denied Allred permission to do so; Allred, Angelova says, threatened to withdraw as her attorney unless she claimed retroactively to have given her permission.

In June 2023, a civil lawsuit was filed by a woman represented by Allred in Los Angeles County accusing film director Roman Polanski of sexually assaulting her by giving her alcohol and subsequently raping her in 1973 when she was a minor. While Polanski denied the allegations, the parties reached an undisclosed out-of-court settlement over the summer of 2024, and the case was formally dismissed in October 2024.

In 2024, Allred represented various individuals claiming to have been sexual assault victims of rapper and music producer Sean "Diddy" Combs.

In 2025, Allred represented photographer Guadelupe De Los Santos in a lawsuit against rapper 50 Cent, alleging assault and related claims stemming from an incident in Los Angeles.

=== Entertainment ===
Allred co-hosted a radio talk show with Mark Taylor on KABC in Los Angeles for 14 years. She also served as a panelist on the 1990 revival of television game show To Tell the Truth. On March 28, 2000, Allred was parodied on the animated TV show Family Guy, by a character named "Gloria Ironbox", voiced by Candice Bergen, in an episode titled "I Am Peter, Hear Me Roar". Allred appears as herself in the 2001 film Rat Race. On May 21, 2001, she was parodied on The Simpsons episode "Behind the Laughter", portraying a lawyer at the family table for Lisa Simpson. On June 27, 2001, she was parodied on South Park's episode "Cripple Fight".

On September 12, 2011, Allred debuted into the courtroom television genre with We the People with Gloria Allred, a show using improv actors to reenact fictitious case scenarios. In April 2013, Allred appeared on the reality show RuPaul's Drag Race (episode "The Final Three, Hunty"), interviewing and advising the final three contestants on selling themselves as "America's Next Drag Superstar". On November 27, 2016, Allred appeared as herself on the Epix TV show Graves.

== Political life ==
Allred founded (incorporated in 1978) and is currently president of the Women's Equal Rights Legal Defense and Education Fund. In 1980, Allred held a fundraiser at Chippendales for WERLDEF.

Gloria Allred has been a member of the advisory board of Women's Day-USA, a California charity dedicated to promoting observation and recognition of March 8 as International Women's Day in the United States.

== Personal life ==
Allred and her first husband, Peyton Huddleston Bray Jr., were married in 1960, and divorced in 1962. She and her second husband, William Allred, married in 1968 and divorced in 1987. Her only child, Lisa Bloom, was born in 1961.

Allred lives in Pacific Palisades, California and has a vacation home in Malibu, California.

She is Jewish, but does not consider herself particularly religious.

== Criticism ==
Allred's public statements and behavior have resulted in criticism. In 2012, The Atlantic described her as "the ambulance chaser of feminism" after she defended two men involved in a sexual battery lawsuit against actor John Travolta. The Daily Beast journalist Tricia Romano also labeled her as a "publicity hound". The New Republic contributor Jeffrey Rosen also described Allred as "a longtime master of the press conference".

Allred's role, along with that of her daughter (attorney Lisa Bloom), in allegedly suppressing the voices of alleged victims of Harvey Weinstein, was chronicled in Jodi Kantor and Megan Twohey's 2019 book She Said: Breaking the Sexual Harassment Story That Helped Ignite a Movement.

=== California bar probe investigation ===
In 2025 The Wall Street Journal reported that several former clients alleged that Allred had used high-pressure tactics to coerce them into accepting settlements with broad nondisclosure agreements (NDAs) attached. Some of those NDAs barred the clients from discussing what had happened to them even with their therapists or spouses. They claim they were pressured into settling even when they were willing to go public with their stories and pursue the claim in court, and told that it was better for them not to discuss the claim as that would jeopardize any money they were likely to receive, money they were told they were lucky to be getting in the first place. They also signed retainer agreements that required any disputes between them and Allred's firm to be settled in confidential arbitration, a procedure Allred has been sharply critical of when used to settle sexual-assault claims. In June 2025, the California State Bar launched an investigation against Allred and her firm. Allred's controversial conduct has been compared to that of Tom Girardi and Michael Avenatti, two lawyers who have been convicted and disbarred.

== Popular culture ==
In the 2001 film Rat Race, she portrayed herself in two brief scenes.

She also appeared in a brief fictional cameo as Lisa's lawyer in The Simpsons season 11 mockumentary episode, "Behind the Laughter".

Allred appeared in the Season 5 South Park episode "Cripple Fight", which aired on June 27, 2001. She successfully represented Big Gay Al in a discrimination case against the Boy Scouts of America.

In early 2018, Netflix debuted a documentary about the life and work of Allred, Seeing Allred, from directors Roberta Grossman and Sophie Sartain.

== Works ==
- Allred, Gloria; Rybak, Deborah Caulfield (2006). Fight Back and Win: My Thirty-Year Fight Against Injustice and How You Can Win Your Own Battles. New York: ReganBooks. ISBN 978-0-06-073928-7. OCLC 62755633.
