= Olga von Root =

Russian actress and aristocrat (1901–1967)

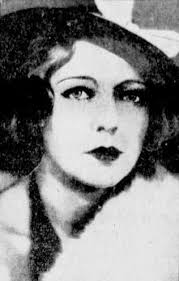
- Born: Olga Vadimovna Baroness von Root; 2 December 1901; Sevastopol, Russian Empire
- Died: 28 June 1967 (aged 65); Orange, California, U.S.
- Resting place: Hollywood Forever Cemetery
- Other names: Olga Vadina; Olga Hammer
- Education: Smolny Institute of Noble Maidens
- Occupations: Singer; actress
- Spouse: Armand Hammer (m. 1927; div. 1943)
- Children: 1
- Relatives: Michael Armand Hammer (grandson); Armie Hammer (great-grandson)

Baroness Olga Vadimovna von Root (Russian: Ольга Вадимовна фон Рот; 2 December 1901 – 28 June 1967) was a Russian stage actress and singer. Born into a noble family of German, Polish, and Greek background, Root was educated at the Smolny Institute of Noble Maidens in Russia.

As a teenager, she ran away from home and travelled with a Romani family, studying their music and dance. During the Russian Revolution, while her father served in the White Army, Root performed in cabarets and nightclubs to help support her family. After the war, she performed in Russia and other European countries as a stage actress and singer under the stage name Olga Vadina. She later married the American industrialist Armand Hammer and moved to the United States, taking up residence in Manhattan. While living in New York, she worked to transcribe numerous Romani ballads. Root is the grandmother of American businessman Michael Armand Hammer and the great-grandmother of American actor Armie Hammer.

== Early life and family ==
Baroness Olga Vadimovna von Root was born in Sevastopol, Crimea in 1901. She was the daughter of Baron Vadim Nikolayevich von Root, a Czarist military officer and nobleman, and Lubov Karlovna Kostsyushko-Valyuzhinich, a member of a Polish landed gentry family. Root's paternal ancestors were Volga German nobility who came to the Russian Empire during the reign of Peter the Great to serve in the Imperial Russian Army. Her maternal grandfather, Karl Kazimirovich Kostsyushko-Valyuzhinich, was Catholic and the founder of the Archeological Museum in Chersonesus. Her maternal grandmother, Maria Pavlovna Reveliotis, was a Russian Orthodox woman of Greek descent and the granddaughter of the Russian landowner and leader of the Greek War of Independence General Theodosios Reveliotis. Through her mother, Root was also a descendant of the Polish national hero Tadeusz Kościuszko.

== Revolution and stage career ==
Root was educated at the Smolny Institute of Noble Maidens in Saint Petersburg, where she trained as a singer. at the age of fifteen, she ran away and took up performing with a troop of Romani performers, learning their music and dances from Nikolai Kroutchine. She was later found and returned to her family.

During the October Revolution, Olga von Root's family moved from Moscow to Kiev. Her father, loyal to Nicholas II of Russia, commanded troops in the White Army throughout the war. To support her family while her father was off fighting, Root began singing in cabarets and night clubs. She was rounded up with other members of the White Movement by Bolsheviks during a raid, imprisoned, and was ordered to be executed. Her life was spared after a Bolshevik colonel, who recognized her from the stage, released her. The colonel later spared her mother and siblings from arrest during a raid on their home. The colonel informed Root that her father would be granted amnesty if he defected from the White Army and joined the Red Army. She wrote to her father and persuaded him to change sides, after which he took a post as an instructor at the Soviety Military Academy.

During the rise of Communism, Root became a star of the stage, as a singer and actress, performing under the name of Olga Vadina. She was one of the top stars of post-Revolutionary Russia's concert theatre and married her manager. She performed a program of Romani ballads at a theatre in Paris, later performing in other European capitals.

While living in New York City with her second husband, Armand Hammer, Root worked with a musician to transcribe Russian and Romani music that she learned throughout her training.

== Personal life ==
In 1925, while performing in Yalta, Root was introduced to the Jewish-American millionaire industrialist Armand Hammer. The two fell in love, and Root obtained a divorce from her first husband in Moscow. She and Hammer were married in a civil ceremony in 1927. They had one son, Julian Armand Hammer, who was born in Moscow in 1928. The family left Moscow in 1930 and took up residence on Fifth Avenue in Manhattan. She and Hammer divorced in 1943.

Root was the grandmother of American businessman Michael Armand Hammer and the great-grandmother of American actor Armie Hammer.
