= Cripple Fight =

- South Park episode
- Episode no.: Season 5 Episode 2
- Directed by: Trey Parker
- Written by: Trey Parker
- Production code: 503
- Original air date: June 27, 2001

Episode chronology
← Previous "It Hits the Fan"	Next → "Super Best Friends"
- South Park season 5

"Cripple Fight" (also stylised as "Cripple Fight!") is the second episode of the fifth season of the animated television series South Park, and the 67th episode of the series overall. Going by production order, it is the 3rd episode instead of the 2nd. It originally aired in the United States on June 27, 2001. In the episode, the boys join a Mountain Scouts troop originally led by Big Gay Al, who is fired due to his homosexuality. Meanwhile Timmy faces competition from Jimmy Swanson, another disabled child who is introduced in this episode and would become a series regular under the new name Jimmy Valmer. The episode is based on the controversy over scoutmaster James Dale and the Supreme Court case Boy Scouts of America v. Dale.

Out of the four main characters only Stan, Cartman, and Kenny make an appearance in this episode. Kyle is completely absent, although his mother Sheila does briefly appear.

== Plot ==
Stan Marsh, Eric Cartman, Kenny McCormick, and Timmy Burch have joined Mountain Scouts troop number 69 and are on their way to their first meeting. When they arrive, they find that their scoutmaster is Big Gay Al. The boys enjoy themselves at the meeting and decide that they like Mountain Scouts, but some parents fear that Big Gay Al will be a poor influence on the boys and that he may be a pedophile.

After a lifetime of membership, Big Gay Al is thrown out of Mountain Scouts by the Head. A new, masculine, scoutmaster named Mr. Grazier is appointed, and he promises the parents he will whip the boys into line and make them good scouts. However, he proceeds to force the boys to pose for naked pictures with a threat to beat them up if they report his actions.

Meanwhile, Jimmy Swanson, a new handicapped boy, comes to town and also joins Mountain Scouts. Jimmy is a stand-up comedian and immediately becomes very popular. Timmy, the other handicapped boy in town, becomes incredibly jealous of the adoration given to the new kid. Timmy tries to undermine Jimmy in any way possible, including offering him an orange parka as a gift, in order to make him resemble Kenny (playing off the running gag that Kenny dies in almost every episode in the first few seasons) and even though Jimmy is nearly killed by a falling safe, a hawk, a fire, a stampede of cows, one of the American Space Shuttles, and gunshots from Jimbo Kern and Ned Gerblansky, his efforts proved futile.

Hoping to get rid of Mr. Grazier without giving away his secret, the boys assemble their own protest march all the way to the grocery store parking lot, and use Jimmy's stand-up comedy to draw in a crowd. However, the performance goes sour when he tries to enlist Timmy's participation, and Timmy refuses. Quickly, they break out into a lengthy fistfight. A very excited Cartman calls it a "cripple fight" and quickly gathers everyone to watch. From the outside, the crowd seems to be for the boy's protest, so it is picked up by the South Park media. A national controversy erupts as the Mountain Scouts are called a hate group by the media and prominent supporters like Steven Spielberg withdraw their support.

Big Gay Al sues the Mountain Scouts, while Mr. Grazier is revealed to be a pedophile who goes by the name "Mr. Slippyfist" and is arrested. Although the Colorado State Supreme Court rules in Big Gay Al's favor and orders the Mountain Scout Elders to take him back and be put in stocks for three days so they can feel like outcasts, Al refuses, saying that while he appreciated what the boys have done for him, he feels "it isn't right to force them to think our way". Al adds while they should be talked into changing their minds, he begs people not to cut their funding or support for the Scouts, adding that he loves the Scouts for the work they do and that they are a private organization. This causes Big Gay Al's lawyer Gloria Allred to brand him as a homophobe. At the same time, Kenny is carried off by the same hawk from earlier (but in the end of episode, Kenny is in the Mountain Scout meeting with other kids alive and healthy).

At the scouts meeting at the end of the episode, with the Head now in charge, Timmy brings up a photoshopped picture of Jimmy's head onto a man's body, who is shown embracing another man. Due to the scouts' views on homosexuality, Jimmy is kicked out of the scouts. The episode ends with Timmy declaring "Timmy!" in delight.

== Production ==
The fight between Jimmy and Timmy is based on the fight between John Nada (Roddy Piper) and Frank Armitage (Keith David) in the 1988 film They Live. When overdubbed with the audio from the film, the fight sounds and much of the dialogue match up almost perfectly with the animation because the sequence was animated to the original track.

Parker stated in the DVD commentary that the episode was his first nervous breakdown after realizing they had nothing prepared for the upcoming season.

Parker and Stone initially intended for this episode to be Jimmy's only appearance, but decided to include the character in subsequent episodes.

== Home media ==
"Cripple Fight", along with the thirteen other episodes from South Park: the Complete Fifth Season, were released on a three-disc DVD set in the United States on February 22, 2005. The sets include brief audio commentaries by Parker and Stone for each episode.

"Cripple Fight" was released on VHS in June 2002, along with the episodes "Scott Tenorman Must Die" and "It Hits the Fan," on a video titled Insults to Injuries. A DVD version of the compilation was released simultaneously, and also contained "Proper Condom Use," in addition to the episodes contained on the VHS release.
