= Michael Armand Hammer =

American businessman (1955–2022)

- Born: September 8, 1955; Los Angeles, California, U.S.
- Died: November 20, 2022 (aged 67)
- Education: University of San Diego; Columbia University
- Occupations: Businessman; philanthropist
- Organization(s): Occidental Petroleum, Armand Hammer Foundation, Hammer International Foundation, Oral Roberts University
- Spouses: Dru Ann Mobley (m. 1985; div. 2012) Misty Millward (m. 2017)
- Children: 2, including Armie
- Relatives: Armand Hammer (grandfather); Olga von Root (grandmother)

Michael Armand Hammer (September 8, 1955 – November 20, 2022) was an American businessman. He was the son of Julian Armand Hammer and the grandson of industrialist Armand Hammer. Best known for his ties to Occidental Petroleum, the company of his late grandfather, Hammer oversaw the Hammer International Foundation, the Armand Hammer Foundation, and owned numerous businesses that included Hammer Galleries, and Hammer Productions, a television and film production company located in Los Angeles, California.

Hammer sat on the board of directors and the executive committee for the Los Angeles Dream Center, and was on the Investment Committee and Board of Reference for Oral Roberts University. Hammer was the owner and chief executive of the Knoedler, an art dealership in New York City, which closed in 2011 after purchasing and reselling $80 million in forged paintings bearing the signature of abstract expressionists such as Mark Rothko and Jackson Pollock.

== Early life ==
Michael Armand Hammer was born on September 8, 1955, in Los Angeles, California. He is the son of Glenna Sue (née Ervin) and Julian Armand Hammer, has two siblings, sister Casey Hammer and half-sister Jan Ward, and has two children, actor Armie Hammer and Viktor, a businessman and entrepreneur. Viktor and Armie Hammer are the only great-grandsons of industrialist Armand Hammer. His paternal grandfather's parents were Ukrainian Jewish immigrants. His paternal grandmother, Russian-born actress Baroness Olga von Root, was the daughter of a czarist general. His mother was a native of Texas.

Hammer studied at the University of San Diego, where he graduated with a degree in business administration in 1978. He later graduated from the Columbia University Graduate School of Business in 1982 with a Master of Business Administration degree.

== Career ==
Before becoming involved with his grandfather's company, Occidental Petroleum, Hammer worked in different roles at the New York City securities and investment banking firm Kidder, Peabody & Co., which later was sold to PaineWebber, which ultimately merged with UBS AG in November 2000. He joined Occidental Petroleum in 1982 and worked in various capacities in the company's facilities in Texas, Oklahoma, London, and Oman. In 1985, he moved to the corporation's headquarters in Los Angeles where he became a vice president, He shortly thereafter became a member of the board of directors and the executive committee, and worked in those capacities until his departure from the company in 1991, not long after the death of Armand Hammer.

Since leaving Occidental, Hammer worked with several companies, including OnVANTAGE, Inc. in 2000, which was later acquired by the company StarCite, Inc., and Avenue Entertainment Group as a member of the Board following an investment in the company by Hammer International in 1999.

== Personal life ==
Hammer married Dru Ann Mobley of Tulsa, Oklahoma, on January 12, 1985, at the First Methodist Church in Tulsa. Hammer became a Christian upon marrying his wife, and was a benefactor of several Christian organizations dedicated to evangelism.

Before they divorced in 2012 after 27 years of marriage, Michael and Dru Hammer had two children, actor Armie Hammer (born 1986) and businessman Viktor Hammer (born 1988).

Hammer formerly resided in a Paul Williams-designed, 1920s Tudor-style mansion, that was featured in films and television shows, including the Bells of St. Mary's, Rocky V, and others. It had erroneously been dubbed "Wayne Manor", as it was thought the house had been used in the Batman TV show, but in fact an adjacent residence was the site used for Batman. The historic mansion was destroyed by fire in October 2005 during a renovation by the Hammers.

On May 30, 2017, he married Misty Millward.

=== Death ===
Hammer died from cancer on November 20, 2022, at the age of 67.
