= It Hits the Fan =

- South Park episode
- Episode no.: Season 5 Episode 1
- Directed by: Trey Parker
- Written by: Trey Parker
- Production code: 502
- Original air date: June 20, 2001

Episode chronology
| ← Previous "A Very Crappy Christmas" | Next → "Cripple Fight" |
- South Park season 5

"It Hits the Fan" is the fifth season premiere of the American animated television series South Park, and the 66th episode of the series overall. It first aired on Comedy Central in the United States on June 20, 2001. In the episode, after the word “shit” is used uncensored on the network television crime show Cop Drama, everyone starts saying the word repeatedly. This eventually brings on a mysterious plague that unleashes the ancient Knights of Standards and Practices, and only Chef and the boys can save the world.

The episode was written and directed by series co-creator Trey Parker and is rated TV-MA-L in the United States. Throughout the episode, the word “shit” and its variants are used uncensored a total of 162 separate times; During the original broadcast, a counter in the lower-left corner tracked each spoken use of the word. The written occurrences are not counted, but "shit" is written 38 times, which brings the count up to an even 200. On average, the word is spoken about once every eight seconds, depending on whether the opening theme is included in the calculation.

This episode marked the transition in animation software from PowerAnimator to Autodesk Maya.

== Plot ==
Kyle has tickets to The Lion King on Stage, but Cartman tells him that the HBC crime show Cop Drama is going to use the word "shit" uncensored. The broadcast of the show leads to widespread acceptance of the word, even in schools, causing people to use it constantly, in casual and often out of context during conversations. Furthermore, Ms. Choksondik is forced to clarify the acceptable context of the word—as a noun or adjective meaning bad, or as an exclamation of disappointment, the word is acceptable, but as a noun or adjective referring to feces, it is apparently unacceptable—thoroughly confusing the children (a reference to the real-life FCC standards of indecency). A strange illness that causes people to spew up their intestines and die suddenly rises in South Park, so action is taken.

Meanwhile, Mr. Garrison teaches the kindergartners not only about the word "shit," but also about the word "fag," which he is allowed to say uncensored because he is homosexual. Later, in the local bar, he demonstrates this when he says the word uncensored, but any heterosexual who attempts to say the word is censored. Finally, Jimbo also says the word, but it is not censored.

The boys then visit with Chef to the library, where they find out that the word is actually a literal "curse word," and its constant utterance has caused a resurgence of the Black Death. Together they head to the HBC Head office to get the executives to stop using it with little luck. "Must Shit TV", a special live event in which episodes of existing shows are taped live with almost every word of dialogue replaced with the word "shit", goes ahead anyway until the Knights of Standards and Practices enter the studio and begin killing the actors (Drew and Mimi from The Drew Carey Show).

In a fit of anger over the Knights trying to stop his TV special, the head of HBC says the word "shit" repeatedly, causing Geldon, a monstrous dragon, to awaken. After the dragon murders several on the set, Kyle destroys it with an ancient magical runestone belonging to a knight in the mystical Order of Standards and Practices. The moral of the story is not that saying "shit" in itself is wrong but saying it in excess leads to boredom with the word. Cartman tells everyone to watch their language, which Kyle and Stan agree on. The episode ends with Kenny accidentally saying "shit", spewing up his intestines, and dying; Stan almost says "Holy shit!" once more but replaces it with "poop".

== Production ==
Executives at Comedy Central were initially uncertain to air the episode uncensored, but they ultimately felt the profanity was justified by context and decided to allow the episode to be broadcast uncensored; which surprised even the show's developers. Creators Matt Stone and Trey Parker stated they wrote the episode because they thought it was funny. Despite broadcasting a record-setting amount of profanity, little controversy was stirred by the broadcast. Co-creator Matt Stone explained the passive reception by citing changing cultural standards, "No one cares anymore... The standards are almost gone. No one gives a shit or a bullshit." According to DVD commentary, they were only going to say the word a few times, which Comedy Central would not allow. However, when Parker and Stone came up with the idea that they would "say it like 200 times, they (Comedy Central) were fine with it."

This episode was selected as #8 on Comedy Central's 2006 marathon of "10 South Parks That Changed the World".

== Reception ==
In 2005, the episode was listed at #93 on TV Land's "Top 100 Most Unexpected Moments in TV History."

== Home media ==
"It Hits the Fan," along with the thirteen other episodes from South Park's fifth season, were released on a three-disc DVD set in the United States on February 22, 2005. The sets included brief audio commentaries by Parker and Stone for each episode.

"It Hits the Fan" was released on VHS in June 2002, along with the episodes "Scott Tenorman Must Die" and "Cripple Fight," on a video titled Insults to Injuries. A DVD version of the compilation was released simultaneously, and also contained "Proper Condom Use," in addition to the episodes contained on the VHS release.
