= Paige Lorenze =

American influencer (born 1998)

Paige Paul
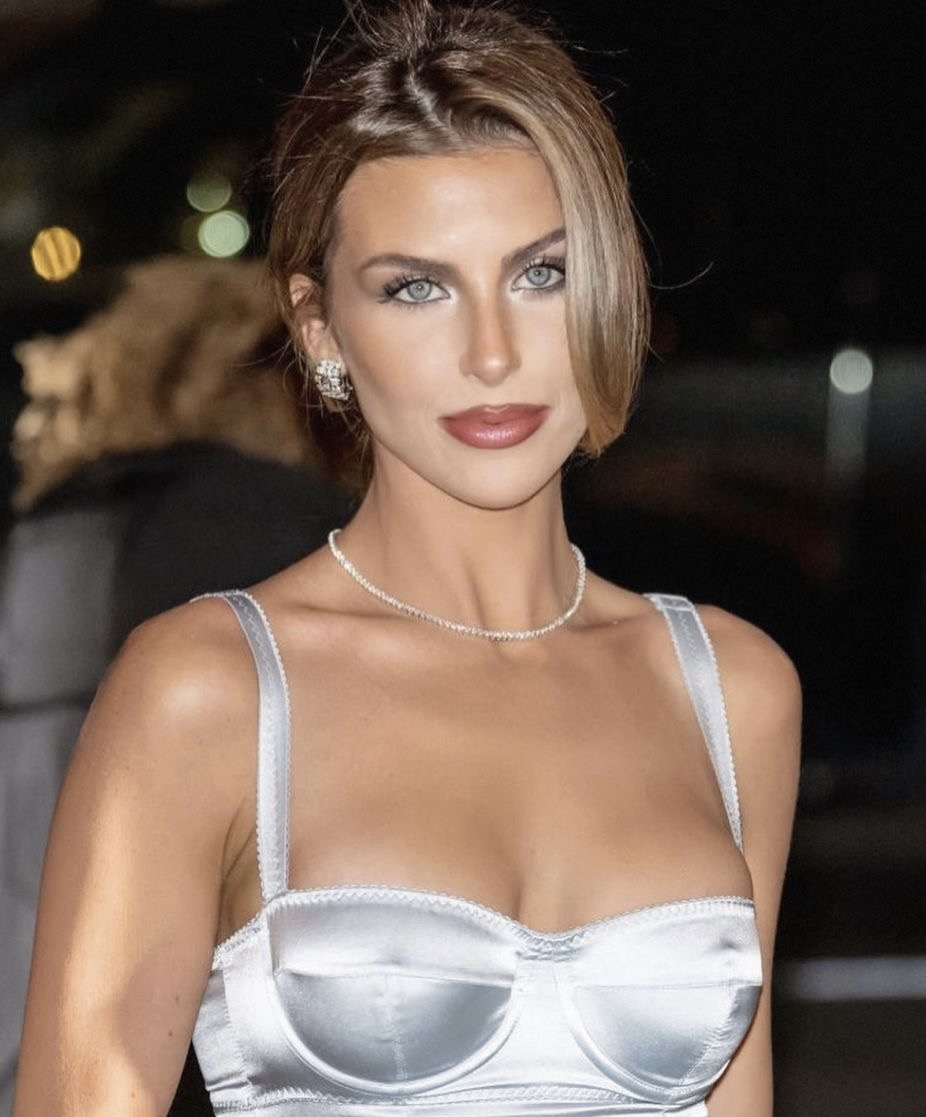
- Lorenze in 2023
- Born: Paige Elizabeth Lorenze; January 26, 1998 (age 28)
- Occupation: entrepreneur
- Spouse: Tommy Paul (m. 2026)

Instagram information
- Page: Paige Paul
- Years active: 2012–present
- Genres: Lifestyle; fashion
- Followers: 1,300,000 (February 2, 2025)

YouTube information
- Channel: Paige Paul
- Years active: 2020–present
- Subscribers: 303,000 (October 29, 2025)
- Views: 14.9 million (February 2, 2025)

Paige Elizabeth Paul (née Lorenze; born January 26, 1998) is an American influencer and entrepreneur known for posting lifestyle and fashion content on Instagram and YouTube. She created the lifestyle brand Dairy Boy in 2021.

== Life and career ==
Lorenze grew up between a in small-town Connecticut and a small town in Vermont. She attended Burke Mountain Academy, a boarding school in Vermont, to train as an alpine skier. She moved to New York City to study at the New School graduating in 2021.

While in New York, Lorenze began posting lifestyle and fashion content on Instagram, followed by a YouTube vlog in early 2020.

In 2021, Lorenze launched the lifestyle brand Dairy Boy.. The brand name comes from her preference for dairy milk over milk alternatives and the concept of returning to your roots. She moved out of the city to Southport, Connecticut, in September 2022 and she reoriented her social media content to a country life, much more reflective of how she was raised. Her vlogs began featuring home cooking, horseback riding, and building her brand from the suburbs. Shorly after leaving Manhattan she started dating professional tennis player Tommy Paul in 2022 and has featured him in her vlogs while accompanying him on tour occasionally. While dating Paul, she opened a Dairy Boy pop-up shop in SoHo during the 2023 US Open. The couple announced their engagement in July 2025. The couple married on July 14, 2026 at Old Westbury Gardens in Long Island, New York.
