= Mezhdunarodnaya Kniga =

Russian agency for book export

- Founded: April 11, 1923; 102 years ago
- Country of origin: Russia
- Headquarters location: Msocow
- Official website: www.mkniga.ru

Mezhdunarodnaya Kniga (MK) (meaning International Books) is a Russian company responsible for the export of Russian (formerly Soviet) books, periodicals, stamps and music to other countries of the world.

During the Soviet era, MK had a monopoly over the export of music records.

== History ==
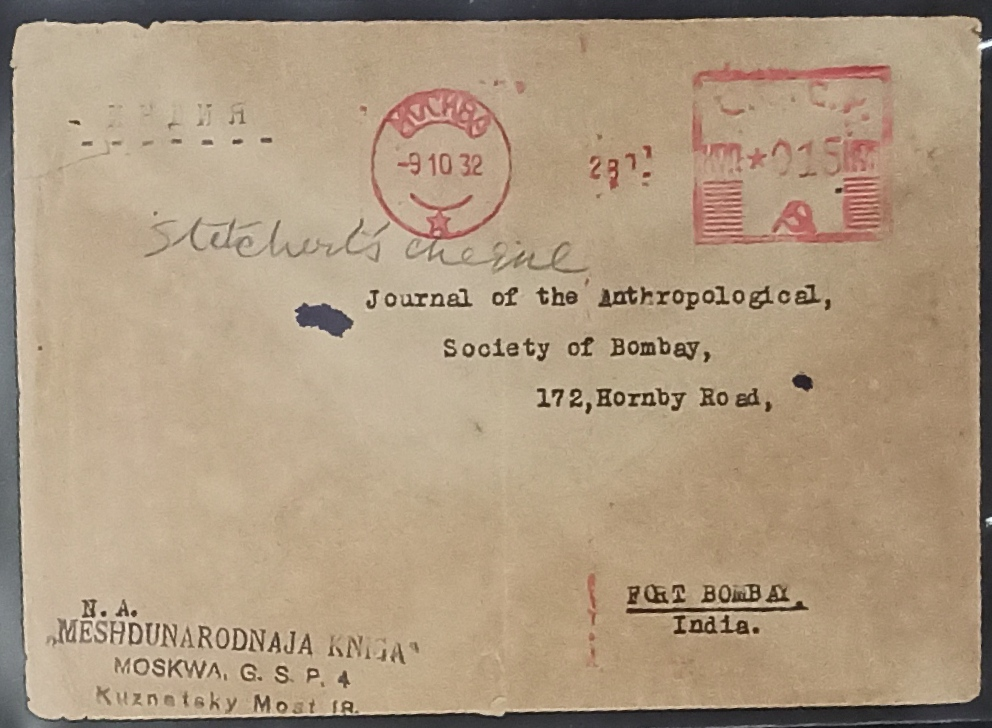
Letter by MK to Anthropological Society of Bombay, India, 1932.

Vladimir Lenin signed a decree on 14 June 1921 titled "Law on Acquiring and Distributing Foreign Literature", that established a Russian – German joint stock company called "Kniga" in Berlin. This company was dedicated to the import and export of books and other literature. In 1922 its Moscow branch office was established under the name "Mezhdunarodnaya Kniga" MK. On 11 April 1923, this company was converted into a "Joint Stock Corporation".

The company filed for bankruptcy in the Arbitration Court of Moscow in January 2012, and the company was liquidated in March 2013 after remaining in business for 90 years. After the company was liquidated, a successor organisation Joint Stock Company “MK Knigi” was established by Nikolai Nikitovich Okhotin in May 2015. This new entity describes itself as “Daughter Company” of Mezhdunarodnaya Kniga, and works as a distributor of Russian books in foreign countries.
