= House of Hammer (TV series) =

2022 American documentary television miniseries

- Promotional poster
- Genre: Documentary; True crime
- Directed by: Elli Hakami; Julian P. Hobbs
- Country of origin: United States
- Original language: English
- No. of episodes: 3

Production
- Production company: Talos Films

Original release
- Network: Discovery+
- Release: September 2, 2022

House of Hammer is an American documentary psychological thriller television miniseries directed by Elli Hakami and Julian P. Hobbs. The documentary revolves around the life of American actor Armie Hammer and his family—who were involved in 2021 in various accusations after several complaints from the actor's ex-girlfriends. The three-part series premiered on September 2, 2022, on Discovery+.
