= Bryson (surname) =

Bryson is a surname. Notable people with the surname include:

- Alexander Bryson (1816–1866), Scottish biologist, geologist, and horologist
- Andrew Bryson (1822–1892), American admiral
- Ann Bryson (born 1964), British actress
- Arthur E. Bryson Jr., American professor of engineering, the "father of modern optimal control theory"
- Bernarda Bryson Shahn (1903–2004), formerly Bernarda Bryson, American painter and lithographer, the widow of artist Ben Shahn
- Bill Bryson (born 1951), American author
- Bill Bryson (politician) (1898–1973), Australian politician
- Bill Bryson Sr. (1915–1986), American sports journalist
- Craig Bryson (born 1986), Scottish footballer
- Dean F. Bryson (1910–1995), American attorney, 77th Associate Justice of the Oregon Supreme Court
- E. Brent Bryson (born 1957), American attorney
- George Bryson Jr. (1852–1937), Quebec lumber merchant and political figure
- George Bryson Sr. (1813–1900), Scottish-born businessman and political figure in Quebec
- Hugh Alexander Bryson (1912–1987), Canadian politician, farmer, and insurance agent
- Ian Bryson (born 1962), Scottish footballer
- Isla Bryson, Scottish transgender criminal
- Jacob Bryson (born 1997), Canadian ice hockey player
- Jeanie Bryson (born 1958), American singer
- Jennifer S. Bryson, American academic
- Jill Bryson (born 1961), Scottish singer and member of Strawberry Switchblade
- Jim Bryson (musician), Canadian singer/songwriter
- Jim Bryson (politician) (born 1961), American politician from Tennessee
- John Bryson (disambiguation), various people
- Joseph R. Bryson (1893–1953), American politician from South Carolina
- Kerenza Bryson (born 1998), British modern pentathlete
- Lindsay Bryson (1925–2005), British admiral
- Lois Bryson (1937–2024), Australian sociologist
- Lyman Bryson (1888–1959), American educator and media adviser
- Marian Bryson (?), All-American Girls Professional Baseball League player
- Michael Bryson (1942–2012), American news and sports reporter and editor
- Oliver Bryson (1896–1977), British fighter ace, Royal Air Force officer, and George Cross recipient
- P. Miles Bryson (born 1964), American collage and sound artist
- Patricia M. Bryson, American clubwoman
- Paul Bryson (born 1968), English cricketer
- Peabo Bryson (1951–2026), American singer-songwriter
- Reid Bryson (1920–2008), American atmospheric scientist, meteorologist, geologist, and professor
- Rudi Bryson (born 1968), South African cricketer
- Shawn Bryson (born 1976), American football professional player
- Thomas Bryson (1826–1882), Quebec merchant and political figure
- William Bryson (disambiguation), various people
- Winifred Bryson (1892–1987), American actress

Fictional characters include:

- Denise/Dennis Bryson, in the television series Twin Peaks

== See also ==
- Bryson (given name)
- Branson (surname)
- Brayson
- Brinson (surname)
- Brison
- Bronson (name)
- Brunson
