= Bryson =

Bryson may refer to:

== People and fictional characters ==
- Bryson (surname)
- Bryson (given name)

== Places ==
=== Canada ===
- Bryson, Quebec, a village and municipality
- Bryson, a hydroelectric station in Quebec

=== United States ===
- Bryson, Missouri, an unincorporated community
- Bryson City, North Carolina, a town
- Bryson, Texas, a city in Jack County
- Bryson Independent School District, Jack County, Texas

== Schools ==
- Bryson College, a college in Fayetteville, Tennessee, United States, from 1919 to 1929
- Bryson High School (Greenville, South Carolina)
- Bryson High School (Bryson, Texas)

== Other uses ==
- Bryson Apartment Hotel, Los Angeles, California

== See also ==
- Brison (disambiguation)
- Brisson (disambiguation)
- Brisons, a British islet in Cornwall
