= Bronson =

Bronson may refer to:

== People ==
- Bronson (name)

== Places in the United States ==
- Bronson, Florida
- Bronson, Iowa
- Bronson, Kansas
- Bronson, Michigan
- Bronson, Texas
- Bronson Township, Michigan
- Bronson Township, Ohio
- Lake Bronson, Minnesota

== Other uses ==
- Then Came Bronson, American TV series
- Bronson, a character in the Nintendo game Mother 3
- Archie Bronson Outfit, an English blues-rock band
- Bronson (film), a film based on the prisoner Michael Peterson's life
- Bronson (group), a collaborative project between American DJs Odesza and Australian producer Golden Features
  - Their 2020 album of the same name

== See also ==
- Branson (disambiguation)
- Branston (disambiguation)
- Justice Bronson (disambiguation)
