= Branson (surname) =

Branson is an English surname. Notable people with the surname include:

== Arts and entertainment ==
- Clive Branson (1907–44), British artist and poet
- David Branson (1963–2001), Australian theatre director
- Edith Branson (1891–1976), American painter
- Jeff Branson (born 1977), American actor
- Vernon Mostyn Branson (1908–1992), Australian author and publisher

== Politics and activism ==
- Alan Branson, American politician
- Catherine Branson (born 1948), Australian human rights commissioner
- David H. Branson (1827–1896), American politician from Pennsylvania
- George Branson (1918–1999), Australian politician
- Noreen Branson (1910–2003), British communist activist
- Winnie Branson (1927–1972), Aboriginal Australian activist

== Science ==
- Edward Branson, American geologist and paleontologist
- Frederick Woodward Branson (1851–1933), British chemist, glassblower, instrument maker and X-ray pioneer
- Herman Branson (1914–1995), African-American physicist

== Sport ==
- Brad Branson (1958–2026), American basketball player
- Don Branson (1920–66), American racecar driver
- Jeff Branson (baseball player) (born 1967), American Major League baseball player
- Jesse Branson (1942–2014), American basketball player
- Tony Branson (1946–2020), Australian rugby league player

== Other fields ==
- G. A. H. Branson (1871–1951), judge of the High Court of England and Wales
- Richard Branson (born 1950), British entrepreneur
- William Henry Branson (1887–1961), American Seventh-day Adventist

== See also ==
- Walter Bransen
- Branson (disambiguation)
- Brayson
- Brinson (surname)
- Brison
- Bronson (name)
- Brunson
- Bryson (surname)
