= Brunson =

Brunson is a surname. Notable people with the surname include:

- Alfred Brunson (1793–1882), American politician
- Andrew Brunson (born 1968), American Presbyterian pastor in Turkey
- Benjamin Wetherill Brunson (1823–1898), American politician
- Bill Brunson, American football player
- Cindy Brunson, American sports anchor and reporter
- Clare Brunson (born 1989), American retired acrobatic gymnast
- Darmirra Brunson (born 1986), American actress, comedian, singer
- Derek Brunson (born 1984), American mixed martial artist
- Dorothy Brunson (1939–2011), African-American broadcaster
- Doyle Brunson (1933–2023), American poker player
- Emma Brunson (1887–1980), American architect
- Ira B. Brunson (1815–1883), American politician
- Jalen Brunson (born 1996), American basketball player
- Katherine Brunson, American archaeologist
- Lakatriona Brunson (born 1977), American actress, teacher, athlete
- Larry Brunson (born 1949), American former football player
- Mac Brunson (born 1957), American minister
- Michael Brunson (born 1940), British broadcasting political journalist
- Mike Brunson (1947–2002), American former football player
- Milton Brunson (1929–1997), American gospel musician
- Quinta Brunson (born 1989), American actress, comedian, writer, producer
- Rebekkah Brunson (born 1981), American basketball coach and former player
- Rick Brunson (born 1972), American basketball coach and former player
- Seymour Brunson (1798–1840), American missionaries
- T. J. Brunson (born 1997), American football player
- Todd Brunson (born 1969), American poker player
- Tyrone Brunson (disambiguation), multiple people
- Will Brunson (1970–2019), American baseball player
- Xavier Brunson (born 1968), U.S. Army general

== See also ==
- Branson (surname)
- Brayson
- Brinson (surname)
- Bronson (name)
- Bryson (surname)
