= Brayson =

Brayson is a surname. Notable people with the surname include:

- Paul Brayson (born 1977), English footballer
- Óscar Brayson (born 1985), Cuban judoka

Given name

- Brayson "Bray" Hubbard, American football player

== See also ==
- Branson (surname)
- Brinson (surname)
- Brison
- Bronson (name)
- Brunson
- Bryson (surname)
