= Bryson High School =

Bryson High School can refer to:

- Bryson High School (Greenville, South Carolina)
- Bryson High School (Bryson, Texas)

== See also ==
- Swain County High School, Bryson City, North Carolina, known as Bryson City High School from 1924 to 1950
