= Richard D. Bronson =

Richard D. Bronson may refer to:

- Richard Bronson (born 1941), American mathematician
- Richard "Skip" Bronson, American real estate developer
