= Jim Bryson =

Jim Bryson may refer to:

- Jim Bryson (musician)
- Jim Bryson (politician)

== See also ==
- James Bryson, Irish Presbyterian minister
