= University Village, Grand Forks, North Dakota =

Coordinates: 47°55′42″N 97°04′25″W

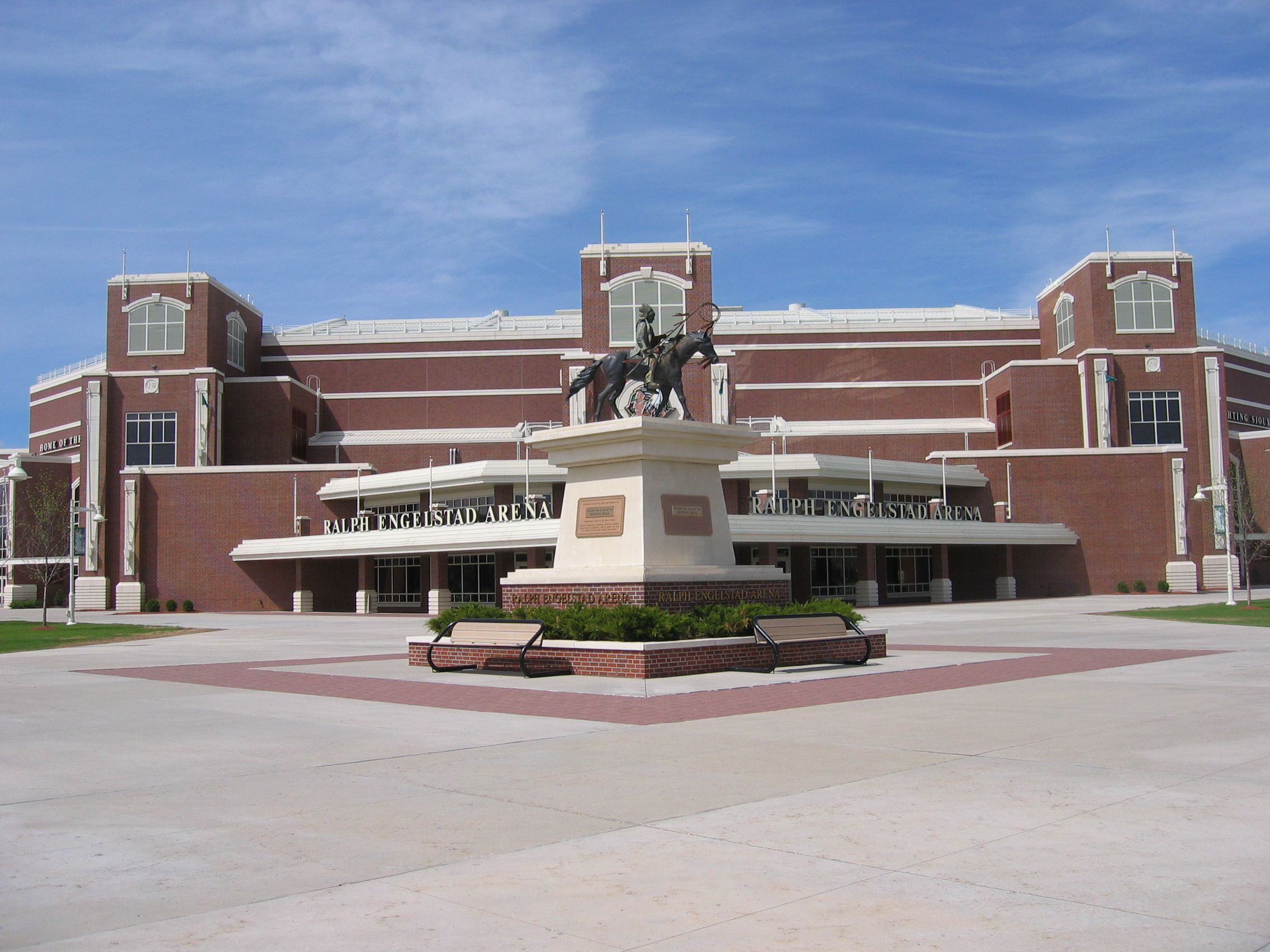
Ralph Engelstad Arena in University Village

University Village (also known as the Bronson Property) is a neighborhood in Grand Forks, North Dakota. It is a part of the University of North Dakota (UND) campus and is located directly north of UND's central campus area. The property comprises 160 acres (0.65 km^{2}) located on the banks of the meandering English Coulee directly off U.S. Highway 2. University Village has been developed as a commercial and residential neighborhood with the Ralph Engelstad Arena as the major anchor and has been called "the most valuable piece of real estate in North Dakota."

== History ==
Formerly known as the Bronson Property, the land was donated to UND by local attorney and judge Harrison A. Bronson who, in 1895, became the recipient of the first master's degree awarded by UND. For decades, the area contained no structures and was used only for intramural fields and community garden space. After the devastating Red River Flood of 1997, plans were drawn up to develop the property. The plan called for UND, commercial, and residential uses.

In 2000, the first building constructed at University Village — a new Barnes & Noble College Booksellers store — opened its doors. The store has since changed suppliers and is now run by Follett Book Company. At that time, construction was well underway on a large ice arena which would be the centerpiece of the new neighborhood. In 2001, the $100+ million Ralph Engelstad Arena opened. The ice arena is home to the UND Fighting Hawks ice hockey program. Former hockey star Wayne Gretzky has called the arena "one of the most beautiful buildings we have in North America." In 2004, a $7 million addition, known as the Betty Engelstad Sioux Center, was constructed adjacent to the Ralph Engelstad Arena and is home to the Fighting Hawks basketball and Fighting Hawks volleyball programs. In 2006, the $20 million UND Student Wellness Center opened doors in University Village. Other buildings which have been constructed on the property include a family practice clinic, two strip malls, two banks, a bar and grill (which went out of business in 2008), new university run student apartments, and a gas station. A large townhouse development has also been built on the west side of the property. A new facility for the School of Medicine and Health Sciences was built on the property and opened in July 2016.
