= Brisson =

Brisson is a French surname. Notable people with the surname include:

- Antoine-François Brisson (1728–1796), French lawyer
- Barnabé Brisson (1531–1591), French jurist and politician
- Barnabé Brisson (engineer) (1777–1828), French engineer
- Brendan Brisson (born 2001), American ice hockey player
- Claire-Marie Brisson (born 1991), American university professor
- Eugène Henri Brisson (1835–1912), Prime Minister of France
- François Brisson (born 1958), French footballer
- Gerry Brisson (1937–2013), Canadian hockey player and coach
- Jean-Paul Brisson (1918–2006), French historian of Roman history
- Jean-Serge Brisson (born 1954), Canadian politician
- Louis Brisson (1817–1908), French cleric later sainted
- Mathurin Jacques Brisson (1723–1806), French zoologist
- Thérèse Brisson (born 1966), Canadian ice hockey player

== See also ==
- Brisson, Ontario, a former Canadian locality in the township of Russell in Ontario, Canada;
- Brisson River, tributary of the Quebec Grand Touradi river, in the Bas-Saint-Laurent administrative region, in Quebec, Canada;
- Brisson River (Rimouski River tributary), tributary of the eastern bank of the Rimouski River of the Bas-Saint-Laurent, in Quebec, Canada.
- Brisson River (rivière aux Anglais), a tributary of the rivière aux Anglais in Rivière-aux-Outardes, Quebec, Canada
- Brison (disambiguation)
