= William Bryson =

William Bryson may refer to:

- William Bryson (minister) (1730–1815), Irish Presbyterian minister.
- William Bryson (civil engineer) (1823–1903), Scottish civil engineer, surveyor and architect
- William Bryson (electrical engineer) (1855–1906), Scottish electrical and marine engineer
- William Curtis Bryson (born 1945), American judge
- Bill Bryson (politician) (1898–1973), Australian Labor Party politician
- Bill Bryson Sr. (1915–1986), American journalist,
- Bill Bryson (born 1951), UK-based American author, son of Bill Bryson Sr.
