= Brinson (surname) =

Brinson is a surname. Notable people with the surname include:

- Bob Brinson, American politician
- Craig Brinson, boxer
- Dana Brinson (born 1965), American football player
- Gary P. Brinson, investor and founder of Brinson Partners, later head of UBS Asset Management
- L. Catherine Brinson, American materials scientist
- Lewis Brinson (born 1994), American baseball player
- Linda Carter Brinson, journalist and editor
- Samuel M. Brinson, politician
- Warren Brinson (born 2002), American football player

== See also ==
- Branson (surname)
- Brison
- Bronson (name)
- Brunson
- Bryson (surname)
