= Manski =

Manski is a Slavic surname and probably a reduced form of Schimanski. Notable people with the name include:

- Charles F. Manski (1948), American economist
- Dorothee Manski (1892–1967), German-born American operatic soprano and voice teacher
