= John Bryson (disambiguation) =

John Bryson (1943–2025) was an American businessman and 37th United States Secretary of Commerce.

John Bryson may also refer to:

- John Bryson (mayor) (1819–1907), American politician, 19th mayor of Los Angeles, California
- John Bryson (author) (1935–2022), Australian author and former lawyer
- John Bryson (Canadian politician) (1849–1896), Canadian lumberman, farmer, and politician from Quebec
- John Bryson (RAF officer) (1913?–1940), Canadian fighter pilot

== See also ==
- John Bryson Chane (born 1944), Episcopal bishop of Washington
