= University Village =

University Village may mean:

- University Village, Albany, California
- University Village, Chicago, Illinois
- University Village, Grand Forks, North Dakota
- University Village (Manhattan)
- University Village, Riverside, California
- University Village, Seattle, Washington
- Univerzitetsko Selo (University Village), Belgrade, Serbia
