= Brison =

Brison is a given name and a surname. Notable people with the name include:

== Given name ==
- Brison Farner, American professional wrestler signed under the ring name Bryce Donovan
- Brison D. Gooch (1925–2014), American historian, professor emeritus
- Brison Manor (born 1952), American football defensive

== Surname ==
- Bill Brison (born 1929), American Anglican priest
- Derek Brison (born 1986), Aruban footballer
- Jonathan Brison (born 1983), French footballer
- Scott Brison (born 1967), Canadian politician
- Susan Brison, Professor of Philosophy at Dartmouth College

== See also ==
- Brison-Saint-Innocent, commune in the Savoie department in the Rhône-Alpes region in France
- Brisons, twin-peaked islet in the Atlantic situated 1 mile (1.6 km) offshore from Cape Cornwall in Cornwall, United Kingdom
- Brisson (disambiguation)
- Brizon (disambiguation)
- Branson (surname)
- Brayson
- Brinson (surname)
- Bronson (name)
- Brunson
- Bryson (disambiguation)
