= Galanter =

Galanter is a surname. Notable people with the surname include:

- Eugene Galanter, academic and psychologist
- Marc Galanter (law professor), legal scholar
- Marc Galanter (psychiatrist), American psychiatrist
- Mareva Galanter, French actress
- Neil Galanter, pianist
- Ruth Galanter, Californian politician
- Yale Galanter, US attorney
