= Antoine-François Brisson =

18th-century French lawyer

Antoine-François Brisson (25 October 1728 in Paris – 1796 in Lyon) was an 18th-century French lawyer.

An inspector of commerce and manufacture for the financial district of Lyon, Brisson published Manière de retirer de la pomme de terre la poudre blanche que l'on nomme amidon, fécule farine, Lyon, 1779 and Mémoires historiques et économiques sur le Beaujolais, Lyon, 1795.

Brisson was a member of various academies, including the Académie des sciences, belles-lettres et arts de Lyon which keeps twenty-three manuscripts from him on several topics, and the Académie de Villefranche.

He wrote the articles toilerie and Suisses, privileges des Suisses en France pour leur commerce for the Encyclopédie by Diderot.

His son, Barnabé Brisson (1777–1828), was an engineer.

== Sources ==
- Joseph-Marie Quérard, La Littérature française contemporaine. XIXe, t. 1, Paris, Daguin Frères, 1842, p. 533.
