= Felicia Weathers =

American soprano (born 1937)

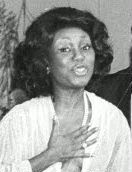
- Weathers at a 1976 German charity event
- Born: August 13, 1937; St. Louis, Missouri, U.S.
- Education: Indiana University School of Music
- Occupation: Operatic soprano

Felicia Weathers (born 13 August 1937) is an American soprano in opera and concert.

== Life and career ==
Weathers was born in St. Louis, Missouri. She entered Washington University in St. Louis with a medical career in mind, but after one year she transferred to Lincoln University (Missouri) to study music. In 1957, she placed second in the Metropolitan Opera National Council Auditions. Weathers attended Indiana University School of Music, where she studied voice with Dorothee Manski, Charles Kullman, and Frank St. Leger. She came to Europe in 1961, and performed in Zurich, Vienna, Munich, Berlin, Hamburg, Paris, Oslo, Copenhagen, Stockholm, The Royal Opera, La Scala, Santa Fe Opera, and the Metropolitan Opera.

One of her supporters was the conductor Herbert von Karajan. Among Weathers' notable opera performances were the leading roles in Salome (R. Strauss), Aida (Verdi), Madama Butterfly (Puccini), and as Donna Anna in Don Giovanni (Mozart), Elisabeth in Don Carlos (Verdi), and many others. She is also a recitalist and concert singer.

Weathers received many international awards, including the Sagittario d'oro award; a national award given by King Harald; and an honorary doctorate in music from Indiana University (1972). February 13 has been designated "Felicia Weathers Day" by the city of Indianapolis, Indiana. In Germany, she received the Deutscher Schallplattenpreis. In 2011, she was recipient of the National Opera Association's "Lift Every Voice" award.

Her last staged opera performance was in 1999 in Germany, where she sang the role of Chrysothemis in Elektra (R. Strauss). She has continued to sing in concerts and teaches voice and vocal technique.

Weathers directed Madama Butterfly for the Ebony National Opera in New York City and for the Heidelberg Oper in Germany. She directed Il trovatore in Philadelphia and Porgy and Bess in Rio de Janeiro.
