= Jane Pitfield =

Canadian politician

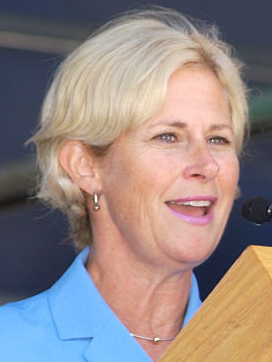
- Pitfield in Nathan Phillips Square in 2003

Prefect of Pontiac Regional County Municipality
- Incumbent
- Assumed office November 5, 2017
- Preceded by: Michel Mercier

Toronto City Councillor for Ward 26 Don Valley West
- In office December 1, 2000 – November 30, 2005
- Preceded by: Riding established
- Succeeded by: John Parker

Toronto City Councillor for Ward 1 East York
- In office September 24, 1998 – November 30, 2000 Serving with Michael Prue and Case Ootes (Note: A special by-election was held in this ward nine months after the original election to elect a 3rd councillor.)
- Preceded by: Riding established
- Succeeded by: Riding abolished

Toronto District School Board Trustee for Ward 4 East York
- In office December 1, 1994 – December 31, 1997 Serving with Ruth Goldhar (Note: In this election two trustees were elected per ward.)
- Succeeded by: Riding abolished

Personal details
- Born: 1954 (age 71–72) Peterborough, Ontario, Canada
- Spouse: Robert H. Pitfield (divorced 2014)
- Relations: George Bryson Sr. (great-great grandfather), George Bryson Jr. (great grandfather)
- Children: 4
- Occupation: Sales person

Jane Pitfield (née Toller; born c. 1954) is a Canadian politician who is the incumbent prefect of Pontiac Regional County Municipality, having served in the position since 2017. She is a former Toronto city councillor, representing one of the two Don Valley West wards. She ran unsuccessfully for Mayor of Toronto in 2006.

== Background ==
A graduate of Queen's University, she worked for several years with Procter & Gamble. In 1989, she founded Concerned Citizens of Leaside to oppose a large development project. She is also the author of Leaside, a history of the neighbourhood.

As of 2017, Pitfield was attempting to attract government funding to create a greenhouse in Gaultois, a small Newfoundland community.

== Politics ==
=== School trustee ===
In 1994, she was elected as a school board trustee in East York's Ward 4. (Note: Results for ward 4 were: Ruth Goldhar 3,534; Jane Pitfield 3,318; Bob Brown 2,009; Stuart Koskie 1,156; Thomas Irwin 923.)

=== City councillor ===
In the first post-amalgamation election in 1997, she ran for city councillor in Ward 1, East York but came third behind winners Michael Prue and Case Ootes. It was later decided, however, that the East York ward was too large for only two councillors. A by-election was held to elect a third councillor, and she won this race. In May 1999 she became chair of the East York Community Council. In November 2000 she was elected in a reorganized council in the riding/ward of Don Valley West. The 2000 election reduced the number of councillors from 57 to 44. Councillors were elected based on two per federal riding boundaries. Joanne Flint represented the other part of the Don Valley West riding.

During the 2003 term, she served as chair of the Works Committee. In 2004, she proposed a 9% water rate increase in early 2004, a higher figure than city staff had recommended. Following intervention from the office of mayor David Miller, the increase was reduced to 6%. Pitfield justified the proposed increase by saying, "This is not to be thought of as taxation. It's a user fee. If you want to pay less, you can use less."

A Globe and Mail report from March 2005 indicated that Pitfield canvassed for Progressive Conservative Party of Ontario leader John Tory during his provincial by-election campaign in Dufferin—Peel—Wellington—Grey.

After the 2003 election, Miller called in councillors to appoint committee chairpersons. Pitfield said she did not get a call. "So I called him", she said. She asked to be chair of the works committee and was appointed. In the mid-term committee chair shuffle, Pitfield left the works and budget committees and joined the audit committee and co-chaired the Aboriginal Affairs Committee.

=== 2006 mayoral race ===
On November 29, 2005, Pitfield announced that she would run against mayor David Miller in the 2006 municipal election.

Pitfield promised to hold off on future tax increases and adopted the slogan, "Always think like a taxpayer". Pitfield also stated that the Mayor should be known as the "Billion Dollar Man" for increasing the city's spending by $1.3 billion since he became mayor in 2003. Miller responded by observing that Toronto's share of the new spending was only $275 million, with the remainder coming from the provincial and federal governments. He later added that most of the spending "is new investment we've secured from provincial and federal government to meet the needs of our city in public transit, in housing, or the 58 new child care centres that we've opened in Toronto this month alone, in Toronto's poorest neighbourhoods".

Pitfield's campaign team included Michael Marzolini, pollster and strategist for former Liberal prime minister Jean Chrétien, and John Foden, Public Affairs consultant. Ontario PC Party treasurer Vic Gupta, who was deputy campaign manager for John Tory's 2003 run for mayor, was on Pitfield's campaign team but bowed out in June 2006, and became lobbyist for the Toronto Port Authority.

In September 2006, Pitfield voted in favour of a bid by Toronto City Council to purchase a landfill site that she had previously spoken against. She claimed that she voted yes in error and admitted to being embarrassed by her mistake. She indicated that she would try to have her vote changed in the official records but wasn't able to reopen the debate to change her vote.

On September 29, the National Post released a survey conducted by Ipsos-Reid that suggested Pitfield was a stronger challenger to Miller than many people believed. The poll showed that of decided voters, 55% would support Miller, while 40% would support Pitfield. In the "absolutely certain" voter category, 51% would support Miller while 46% would support Pitfield. On the same day, former Liberal Party of Canada President Stephen LeDrew also entered the contest.

Her platform for mayor included a public housing program focused on homeownership for low-income families. She accused Miller of being soft on crime and called for a police helicopter, a weapons court and restrictions on bail for individuals with outstanding violent crime charges. She was in favour of incinerating Toronto's garbage as part of a waste-to-energy scheme, as opposed to transporting it by road to Michigan, and set a 60% diversion rate for recycling. She supported building two kilometres of subway per year.

Miller won the contest by a significant margin.

=== After mayoral attempt ===
In 2008, Pitfield was elected president of the Caledon Heritage Foundation. She and her family own a 19th-century house in Caledon, which they are in the process of restoring.

In 2008, she published a book called Leaside which chronicles the foundation and growth of her local neighbourhood called Leaside.

=== 2010 municipal election ===
In January 2010, Pitfield announced that she would run for councillor in East York, Ward 29, to replace Case Ootes following his retirement. She was defeated by newcomer Mary Fragedakis by nearly 2,500 votes.

=== Move to Quebec ===
Pitfield moved to Pontiac, becoming a local business person (operator of Pontiac Conference Centre) and president of Tourism Pontiac. In 2017, she was elected Prefect of the Pontiac Regional County Municipality under her maiden name Jane Toller.

Her great-great-grandfather, George Bryson Sr., served as the then-Warden of Pontiac from 1862 to 1863.

Pitfield has also owned and operated the Gaultois Inn on the south coast of Newfoundland since 2011.

== Electoral history ==
=== Prefectural ===
2021 Quebec municipal election, MRC Pontiac
Prefectural candidate	Vote	%
Jane Toller (X)	3,301	52.69
Michael McCrank	2,964	47.31

2017 Quebec municipal election, MRC Pontiac
Candidate	Votes	%
Jane Toller	3,597	47.0
Raymond Durocher	1,366	17.8
Linda Davis	1,045	13.7
Charlotte L'Ecuyer	828	10.8
Pierre Frechette	817	10.7
Total	7,653	100.0

=== Municipal ===
2010 Toronto election, Ward 29
Candidate	Votes	%
Mary Fragedakis	7,430	41.8
Jane Pitfield	4,966	28.0
Jennifer Wood	4,269	24.0
Chris Caldwell	885	5.0
John Richardson	138	0.8
Mike Restivo	81	0.4
Total	17,769	100.0

2006 Toronto municipal election: Mayor of Toronto
Candidate	Votes	%
David Miller	332,969	56.97
Jane Pitfield	188,932	32.32
Stephen LeDrew	8,078	1.38
35 other candidates	54,508	9.33
Total valid votes	584,484	100.00

For full results, see 2006 Toronto municipal election.

2003 Toronto municipal election, Ward 26 Don Valley West
Candidate	Vote	%
Jane Pitfield	13,602	86.63
Muhammad Alam	1,366	8.70
Orhan Aybars	733	4.67

2000 Toronto municipal election, Ward 26 Don Valley West
Candidate	Vote	%
Jane Pitfield	11,058	70.70
Don Yuill	3,421	21.87
Muhammad Bajwa	1,162	7.43

1997 Toronto municipal election: East York
Candidate	Popular vote			Expenditures
Candidate	Votes	%	±%	Expenditures
Michael Prue	22,440	33.96	–	not available
Case Ootes	8,608	13.03	–	not available
Jane Pitfield	6,926	10.48	–	not available
Michael Tziretas	6,349	9.61	–	not available
Elizabeth Rowley	5,707	8.64	–	not available
Bob Dale	4,709	7.13	–	not available
George Vasilopoulos	4,275	6.47	–	not available
Paul Fernandes	3,156	4.78	–	not available
Paul Robinson	2,885	4.37	–	not available
Hortencia Fotopoulos	663	1.00	–	not available
Edward Wigglesworth	368	0.56	–	not available
Total valid votes	66,086	100.00		
Total rejected, unmarked and declined votes	–	–		
Turnout	66,086	61.29	–	
Eligible voters	107,822			
Note: Candidate campaign colours are based on the prominent colour used in campaign items (signs, literature, etc.) and are used as a visual differentiation between candidates.
Sources: City of Toronto
