= Branston =

Branston may refer to:

== Places in England ==
- Branston, Leicestershire
- Branston, Lincolnshire
- Branston, Staffordshire

== People with the surname ==
- Frank Branston
- Guy Branston
- Jimmy Branston

== Other uses ==
- Branston (brand), a brand of savoury food in the UK

== See also ==
- Branson (disambiguation)
