= Justice Bronson =

Justice Bronson may refer to:

- Greene C. Bronson (1789–1863), associate justice and chief justice of the New York Supreme Court, and judge of the New York Court of Appeals
- Harrison A. Bronson (1873–1947), associate justice of the North Dakota Supreme Court

== See also ==
- Cornelius M. Brosnan (1813–1867), associate justice of the Supreme Court of Nevada
