= Branson =

Branson may refer to:

== Places ==
Canada

- Branson, Toronto

United States

- Branson, Missouri, a resort city in the Ozark Mountains
  - Branson micropolitan area, the area around the Missouri city
- Branson, Colorado
- Branson City, California
- The Branson School, in Ross, California
- Warrenpoint (Knauertown, Pennsylvania), a historic home also known as the William Branson House

== Other uses ==
- Branson (surname), with a list of people of this name
- Branson Ultrasonics, an ultrasonic technology company
- Branson Combs (born 2000), American football player
- Branson Deen (born 2000), American football player
- Branson Reese, American comics artist and writer
- Branson Taylor (born 2002), American football player

== See also ==
- Branston (disambiguation)
- Bronson (disambiguation)
