= Brizon =

Brizon may refer to:

- Brizon, Haute-Savoie, France, a commune
- Pierre Brizon (1878–1923), French teacher, national deputy and pacifist
- Roni Brizon (born 1944), Israeli former politician
- "Brizon" (Lexx), an episode of the television series Lexx

== See also ==
- Brison (disambiguation)
