= William Bryson (electrical engineer) =

Scottish electrical engineer (1855–1906)

William Alexander Bryson FRSE (2 March 1855 – 9 July 1906), was a Scottish electrical engineer.

== Life ==
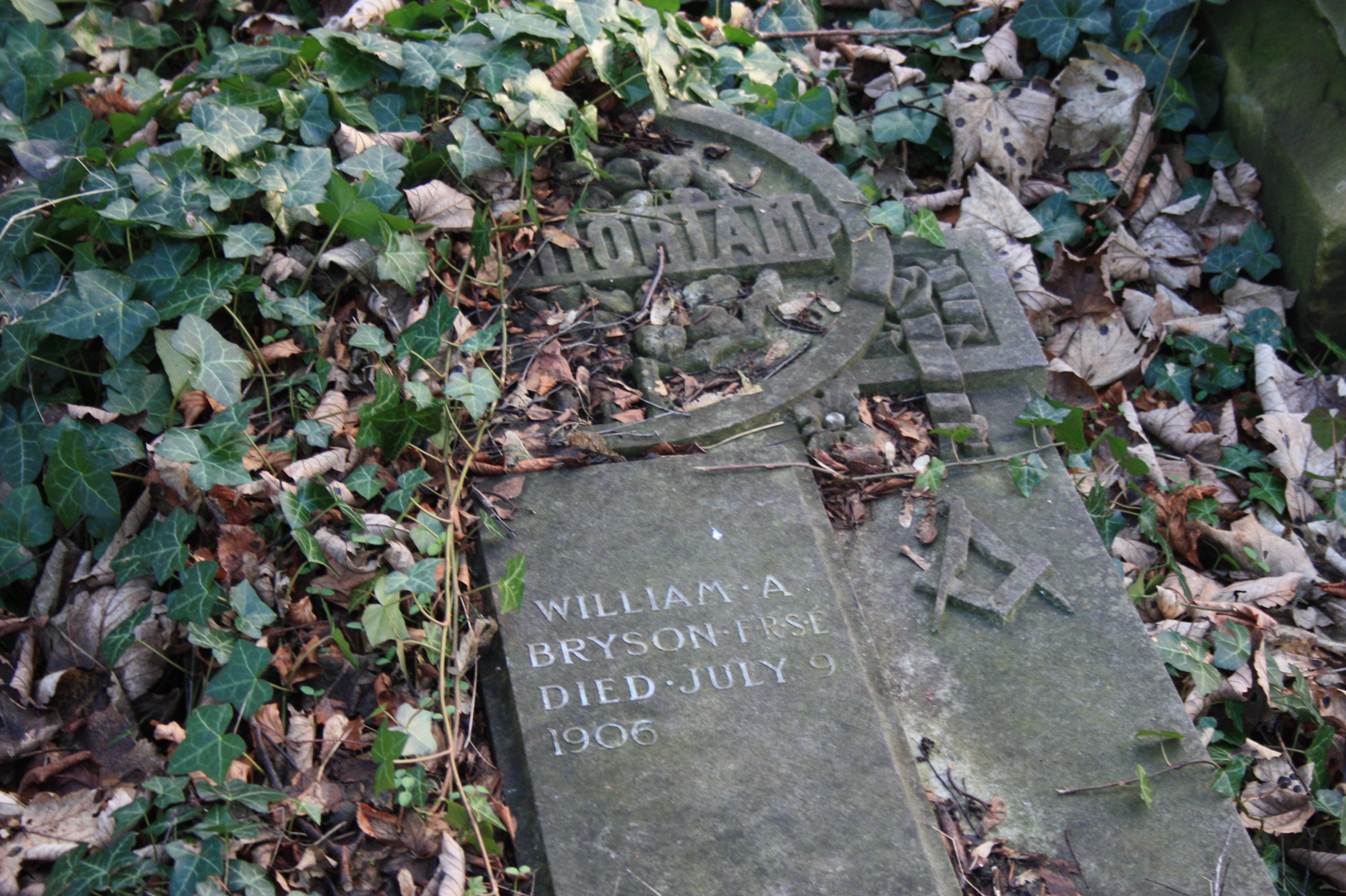
The grave of William Bryson, Warriston Cemetery, Edinburgh

He was born on 2 March 1855, the son of Alexander Bryson a clockmaker with Robert Bryson & Son, and his wife Elizabeth Waterstone Gillespie. His grandfather was Robert Bryson. The family lived at 4 Inverleith Terrace in north Edinburgh.

His mother died shortly after he was born, and his father, who remarried twice in the meantime, died when he was aged 11. He trained and worked as a Marine Engineer in Leith, and then moved to Glasgow as a consulting Electrical Engineer. There is a sketch of him by John Lavery in the Glasgow Museum Resource Centre.

He managed the lighting for the 1886 Edinburgh International Exhibition, and the Royal Jubilee Exhibition in 1887

In 1888 he was elected a Fellow of the Royal Society of Edinburgh, with his proposers being William Thompson (Lord Kelvin), James Thomson Bottomley, William F King and William Walter James Nicol (inventor of the Kallitype photographic process) .

In 1889 he became a member of the Institution of Electrical Engineers.

He supervised the installation of the Electrical Lighting system at Leith, which had electric lighting by 1890 - relatively early.

He lived at 37 Park Road in the Newhaven district of Edinburgh and had offices at 16 Queen Charlotte Street in Leith.

He died on 9 July 1906. He is buried in Warriston Cemetery. The grave lies on the diagonal path joining the lower vaults to the sealed eastern entrance. The stone is currently (2018) vandalised and is lying on the ground in undergrowth.
