= Walter Bransen =

German physician, violinist and composer

Walter Bransen, also Walther Bransen (6 May 1886 – 21 October 1941), was a German physician, violinist and composer. His pseudonyms were Will Rollins, Sam Fox and Karl Wetter.

== Life ==
Bransen was born in 1886 as Walter Abramssohn in Braunschweig. After studying medicine, he switched to music in the 1920s and became a student of the Russian-Swiss composer Paul Juon.

He wrote operas and operettas, chamber music and incidental music but also songs and Schlager, the latter mostly under the stage name "Will Rollins". He worked with renowned lyricists such as Fritz Rotter, Robert Gilbert and Willy Rosen. Bransen published with several Berlin publishers. Popular performers ensured the circulation of his pieces, which were performed by bands such as Dajos Béla, Otto Dobrindt ("Dobbri") and Paul Godwin, performed by singers like Serge Aranovic, Austin Egen and Leo Monosson.

Soon he was also working for the new media of gramophone, radio and cinema. For the newly founded Berlin record company Vox he composed a "Vox-Foxtrot", which the orchestra Bernard Etté recorded in January 1925. It was through this company, whose building in Berlin, the Vox-Haus, also housed the first German radio station in 1923, that his path to broadcasting led him. From June 1925, he headed the department for instrumental and vocal arts at the "Deutsche Stunde, Gesellschaft für drahtlose Belehrung und Unterhaltung G.m.b.H." whose radio orchestra, also from June 1925, was conducted by Bruno Seidler-Winkler.

Together with the dance teacher Walter Carlos, who also worked on the new medium of radio as a "radio dance teacher", he created the "German Dance" DETA in autumn 1927, which was also distributed on records For two feature films he was involved as a film composer The songs from the film Ich war zu Heidelberg Student (director Wolfgang Neff. World premiere: 1 July 1927, Berlin, U.T. Turmstraße) were popularised by the German singer Franz Baumann, who also wrote lyrics himself. Bransen wrote the premiere music for the film Die Frau, nach der man sich sehnt (director Kurt Bernhard. Premiere 28 April 1929, Berlin, Mozartsaal). Other compositions for the film were provided by Edward Kilenyi and Giuseppe Becce.

Bransen was married to the Polish-born soprano Dorothea Manski. There is evidence of a test recording of her with a composition by her husband ("Anita-Boston") for the Berlin company Vox, whose lyrics "Baby, träum' von mir, träume süss" were written by Karl Brüll.

As a Jewish artist he saw his existence threatened by the strengthening of the National Socialists and was forced to emigrate; with his wife and daughter Inge he left Germany even before the Machtergreifung in 1933. On the steamship "Ïle de France they sailed to America. Bransen would have had to have his medical training in Germany recognised in the USA by taking another exam, which he refused to do. He preferred to play the violin in the orchestra of the Metropolitan Opera in New York, where his wife was engaged as a singer.

In America, he continued to compose songs. He set poems by Robert Burns and Christina Georgina Rosetti to music, as well as several texts by Thomas Grant Springer. Walter Bransen died in Bloomington, Indiana (US) in 1941.

== Work ==
Worldcat lists 28 titles by Bransen:.

- Stage works:
  - Der Theatergraf : Operette in 3 Akten. Musik v. Walter Bransen. Textbuch v. Fritz Lunzer & Felix Körner. Ausgabe: Als Ms. gedr. Berlin, Schlesinger, Erscheinungsjahr 1921
- Liedschlager (as ‚Will Rollins‘):
  - Die kleine Susanne (text by Fritz Rotter)
  - Ich hab' ein Rendez-vous (with Rene Porges; text by Willy Rosen)
  - Liebchen, Gut’ Nacht. Lied (ext: Franz Baumann)
  - Liebling fahr doch an die Nordsee mit mir (with Austin Egen, text: Fritz Rotter)
  - Mein ganzer Reichtum (text by Fritz Rotter)
  - Süß singt die Geige “Gut’ Nacht”. Tango (with Will Meisel)
  - Wieso ist der Walter so klug für sein Alter (text: Fritz Rotter)
- Liedschlager (as "Walter Bransen"):
  - Anita. Boston (text: Karl Brüll)
  - Auf der grünen Wiese. Foxtrott (with Walter Borchert, text by Fritz Rotter & Otto Stransky)
  - Du meines Lebens Sonnenschein. Walzerlied
  - Heut sing ich nur für dich. Valse Boston (text: Franz Baumann)
  - Liebchen, gute Nacht! Lied (text: Franz Baumann)
  - Wilde Rosen und Becherklang. Lied (text by Hans Erich Winkler)
  - Wir leben, wir lieben, wer weiß wie lange (with Austin Egen, text Fritz Rotter)

a) for "Will Rollins":

  - Mein ganzer Reichtum / Will Rollins, Text: Fritz Rotter. Franz Baumann, Tenor, mit Violine, Cello, Klavier. Tri-Ergon T.E.1057 [M 339]
  - Ich hab ein Rendezvous / Musik v. Rene Porges u. Will Rollins – Text von Willy Rosen. Ultraphon A 912 [mx. 16 845]. Alfred Beres mit seinem Orchester. Refraingesang: Leo Emm [d. i. Monosson]
  - Süß singt die Geige "Gut' Nacht" : Tango / Will Rollins – Text: Robert Gilbert. Saxophon-Orchester Dobbri mit Gesang. Beka B.6773 [mx. 37 561]
  - Süß singt die Geige "Gute Nacht" : Lied / Will Rollins – Text: Robert Gilbert. Serge Aranovic mit Orchester unter Leitung von Kapellmeister O. Dobrindt. Parlophon B.12 121 [mx. 37 929-2 ]
  - Süß singt die Geige der Nacht : Tango / Will Rollins. Text: Rob. Gilbert. Tango-Orchester Dajos Béla mit Gesang. Odeon O-11 086 [ Be 8428 ]
  - Wieso ist der Walter so klug für sein Alter / Austin Egen & Will Rollins, Text von Fr. Rotter. Austin Egen, Bariton mit Klavier. Electrola AM 870 [BD 4735-II].
  - Wieso ist der Walter so klug für sein Alter : Foxtrot / Will Rollins & Austin Egen – Fritz Rotter. Saxophon-Orchester Dobbri, mit Gesang. Beka B 6219 [mx. 34 166]
  - Wieso ist der Walter so klug für sein Alter? / Musik von Austin Egen und Will Rollins – Text von F. Rotter. Austin Egen, Bariton in Deutsch mit Klavier. Electrola Gesellschaft m.b.H., Nowawes und Berlin, E.G. 633 [BD 4735-II] (8-42053)
  - Die kleine Susanne : Foxtrott / Will Rollins. Julian Fuhs mit seinem Orchester. Beka B.6155 [mx. 34 011-2]
  - Die kleine Susanne / Will Rollins, Fritz Rotter. Austin Egen, Bariton in Deutsch mit Klavier. Electrola Gesellschaft m.b.H., Nowawes und Berlin, E.G. 584 [BD 4738-II] (8-42049)

b) for Walter Bransen:

  - Anita. Boston / Walter Bransen. Marek Weber mit seiner Künstlerkapelle vom Esplanade. Parlophon P.1285 [mx. 2-5693]
  - Heut' sing ich nur für dich! : Valse Boston / Walter Bransen. Kapelle Merton. Beka B.6090 [mx. 33 772]
  - Heut' sing ich nur für dich! Valse boston / Walter Bransen. Orchester Dajos Béla. Odeon O-2090 [Be 6020]
  - Heut sing ich nur für dich : Lied und Valse Boston / Walter Bransen. Kapelle Gebrüder Steiner. Artiphon-Record 2554 [2554]
  - Heut' sing ich nur für dich! / Walter Bransen. Text: Franz Baumann. Franz Baumann, Tenor, Begleitung: Klavier und Dajos Béla, Violine. Odeon O-2082 [Be 5579]
  - Wilde Rosen und Becherklang : Lied / Walter Bransen, Text von Hans Erich Winkler. Max Kuttner, Tenor, mit Orchesterbegleitung. Hertie Record No.858 [mx. 2767] B28.8.27
  - Wilde Rosen und Becherklang / Walter Bransen – Text: H. E. Winkler. Franz Baumann, Tenor, mit Violine, Cello, Klavier. Tri-Ergon TE 1060 [mx. 340]
  - Wilde Rosen und Becherklang / Text: Hans Erich Winkler – Music: Walter Bransen. Franz Baumann, Tenor, mit Klavierbegleitung: Fritz Redl. Homocord 4-2353 [mx. M 19 304–2] A29.11.27
  - Wilde Rosen und Becherklang / Walter Bransen – E. Winckler. Franz Baumann with Instrumental-Trio. Beka B.6211 [mx. 34 217]
  - Wilde Rosen und Becherklang / Erich Winckler, Walter Bransen. Franz Baumann, Begleitung: Instrumental-Trio. Odeon O-2156 [Be 5781]
  - Liebchen, gute Nacht! / Walter Bransen, Franz Baumann. Franz Baumann, Tenor mit Orchesterbegleitung. Homocord 4-2534 [mx. M 19 860]
  - Du meines Lebens Sonnenschein : Walzerlied / Walter Bransen. Eugen Transky, Tenor, mit Orchesterbegleitung. Bu-Scha Schallplattenvertriebsges.m.b.H. Berlin S. 42, Katalognummer 217 [mx. 07325]
  - Auf der grünen Wiese : Foxtrott / Walter Bransen & Walter Borchert – Text by Fritz Rotter & Otto Stransky. Saxophon-Orchester Dobbri mit Gesang. Beka B.6172 [mx. 34 113]
- Art Lieder in American Exile:
  - Music of the spring (poem by Enrico D'Amicis; music by Walter Bransen) Verlag: New York, Sprague-Coleman, ©1938. Music of the spring
  - When I am dead, my dearest (poem by Christina Rossetti; music by Walter Bransen) Verlag: New York : Sprague-Coleman, ©1940. Veröffentlichung: Marian Anderson Collection of Printed Music.
  - The forest trees are sighing. Song for voice and piano (poem by Alice Mattullath; music by Walter Bransen) Verlag: New York : Sprague-Coleman, ©1940. Veröffentlichung: Marian Anderson Collection of Printed Music.
  - Peace comes to me. Song for voice and piano (poem by Phylura E. Skalinder; music by Walter Bransen). Verlag: New York : Sprague-Coleman, ©1940. Veröffentlichung: Marian Anderson Collection of Printed Music.
  - There shall be music when you come (music: Walter Bransen, lyrics by Bertita Harding) Verlag: New York : Broadcast Music, Inc., 1941.
    - Wurde aufgeführt
      - im Konzertsaal: Dorothy Hodgkin Dorsey presents Lotte Lehmann, prima donna soprano, Metropolitan Opera, Lauritz Melchior, leading tenor, Metropolitan Opera in joint recital, Constitution Hall, Tuesday evening, Nov. 18, 1941 at 8:30 o'clock. Mr. Paul Ulanowsky at the piano for Mme. Lehmann, Mr. Ignace Strasfogel at the piano for Mr. Melchior.
      - im Radio: vgl. The Post Radio Highlights: Thursday, Dec. 4 1941_Washington, Eastern Standard Time. 9:30, WOL-America Preferred: Lauritz Melchior, tenor. With Wallenstein's Orchestra: "There Shall Be Music When You Come," Walter Bransen.
      - Schallplattenaufzeichnung: Columbia 17 353-D, published 1942 vgl. Yale Universitie’s Library.

== Recordings (selection) ==
The documents can all be found on YouTube:

- Heut sing ich nur für dich. Valse boston by Walter Bransen, played by the Merton Chapel (d. i. Dajos Bela). Beka B.6090-II (mx. 33 772) – 1927
- Die kleine Susanne. Foxtrott (Will Rollins). Julian Fuhs mit seinem Orchester. Beka B.6155 (mx. 34 011-2)
- Liebling, fahr doch an die Nordsee mit mir! (Musik von Austin Egen und Will Rollins. Text von F. Rotter) Austin Egen, Bariton in Deutsch mit Klavier. Electrola E.G.461 (Matr. BW 934)
- Wir leben, wir lieben (Egen und Bransen, text by Fritz Rotter) Austin Egen, Bariton in Deutsch mit Klavier. Electrola E.G.461 (Bw 935-II) aufg. 28 March 1927
- Wieso ist der Walter so klug für sein Alter? (Musik von Austin Egen und Will Rollins. Text von F. Rotter) Austin Egen, Bariton in Deutsch mit Klavier. Electrola E.G.633 (Matr. BD 4735-II.)
- DETA, ein deutscher Tanz by W. Carlos (Walter Bransen) Saxophon-Orchester. Stradivari Record Electro E 2049 ca. 1928
- Süss singt die Geige Gut' Nacht. Tango (Rollins – Gilbert) Paul Godwin Tanz-Orchester mit deutschem Refraingesang: Leo Monosson. Polydor B 51312 / Nr. 22 603. Berlin, 1930

== Recordings ==
- Etikett Vox 3580 “Heut sing ich nur für dich” mit Franz Baumann
- Etikett Odeon O-2082 b “Heut sing ich nur für dich” with Franz Baumann
- Etikett Odeon O-2155 a “Ich war zu Heidelberg Student” mit Franz Baumann
- Künstlerpostkarte von Werner Fuetterer a.d.Film "Ich war zu Heidelberg Student" (1927), Verlag Ross
- Künstlerpostkarte “Franz Baumann, der beliebte Rundfunk-Tenor, singt jetzt nur noch für Schallplatten der Deutschen Grammophon-Aktiengesellschaft”
