= Robert Bryson =

Scottish chronometer and clock maker (1778–1852)

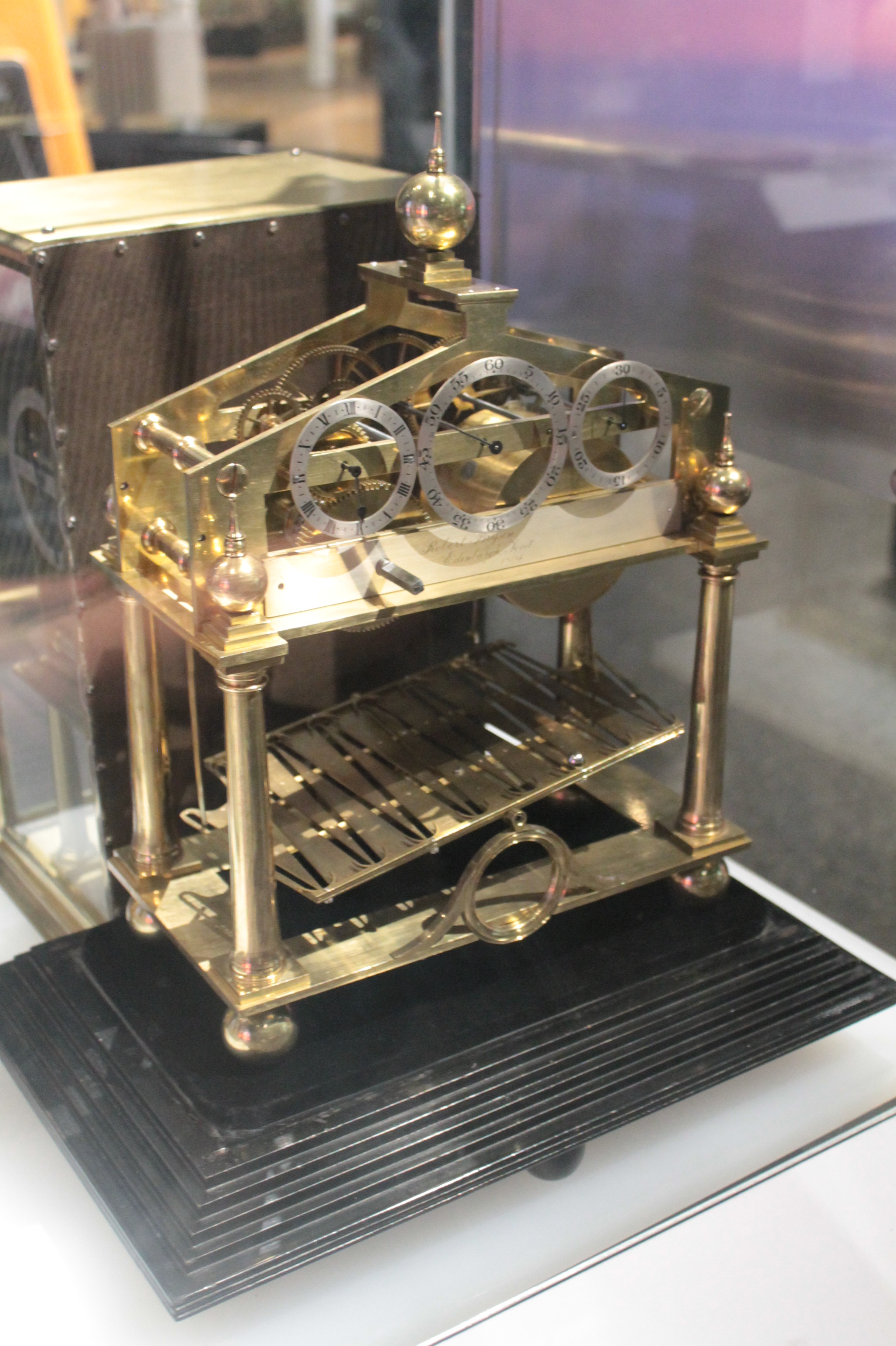
Robert Bryson's rolling ball clock (1804) National Museum of Scotland

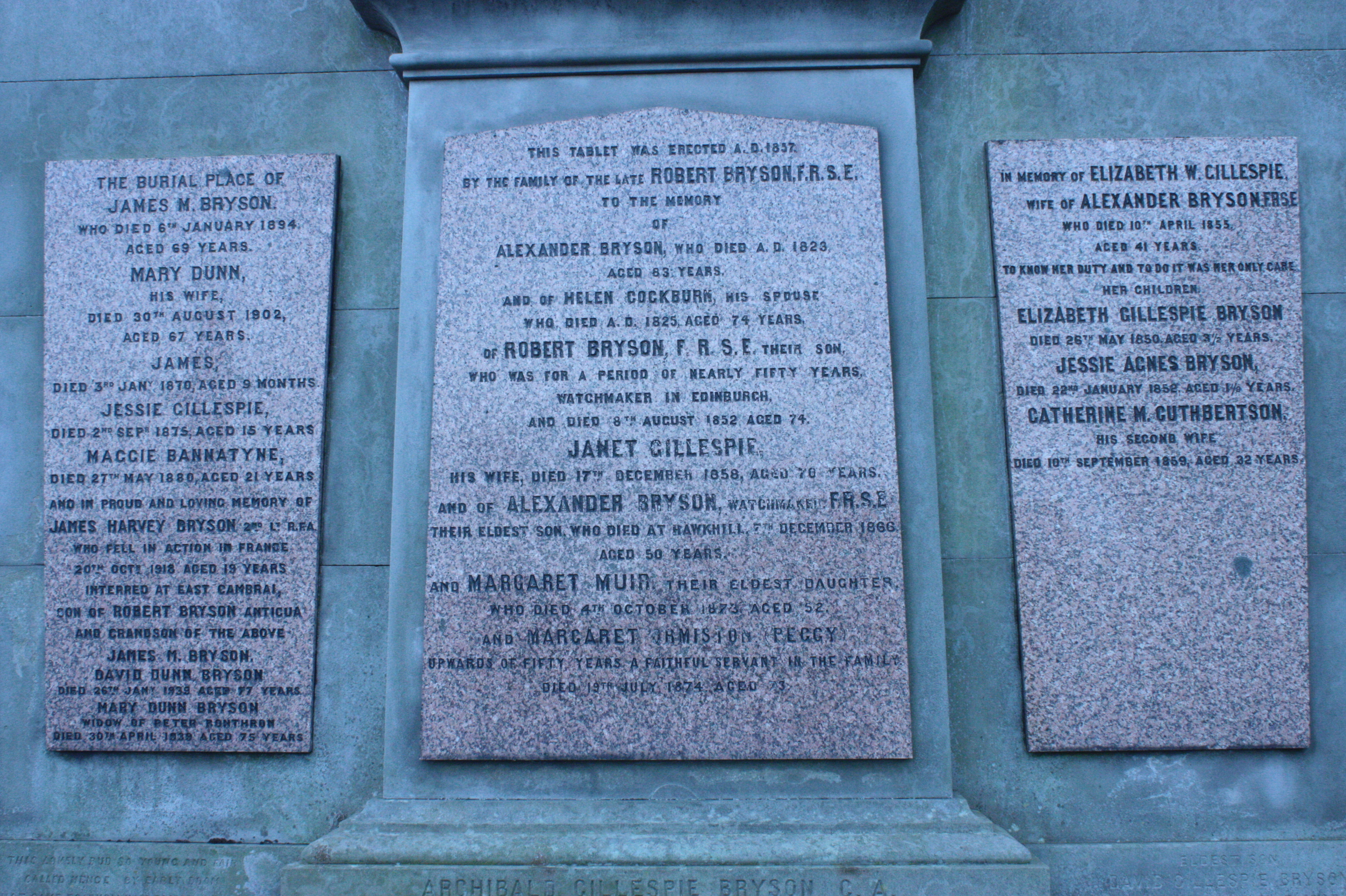
The Bryson family grave, New Calton Cemetery

Robert Bryson FRSE (25 August 1778 – 8 August 1852) was a chronometer and clock maker in Edinburgh. He received the Royal Warrant as Watch and Clock Maker to Queen Victoria.

== Notable Clocks ==
=== "Congreve" Rolling Ball Clock (1804) ===
Robert Bryson made a rolling ball clock in 1804, four years before the design was patented by William Congreve. It is on display at the National Museum of Scotland in Edinburgh.

=== Sidereal Clock for the Calton Hill Observatory (1832) ===
He made a sidereal clock for the City Observatory, formerly the Calton Hill Observatory, where it was used by Professor Thomas Henderson in his observations.

== Heriot-Watt University connection ==
A conversation with Leonard Horner in Robert Bryson's watchmakers shop, regarding the lack of training in mathematics within apprentices, led to the founding of the School of Arts of Edinburgh which became Heriot-Watt University.

== Personal life and death ==
He married Janet Gillespie (1788–1858) on 29 December 1815 in the parish of North Leith. They had four sons and two daughters:

1. Alexander Bryson (1816–1866) - Biologist and Geologist.
2. William Gillespie Bryson (1818-1906)
3. Robert Bryson (1819–1886) - who followed him into the watch and clock business and became, amongst other things, Master of the Merchant Company - married Mary Ann Braund Box - buried in Warriston Cemetery
4. Margaret Muir Bryson (1821–1873)
5. James Mackay Bryson (1824–1894)
6. Helen Cockburn Bryson (1826–1912)

His premises, Robert Bryson & Son was located at 66 Princes Street, Edinburgh and he lived his final years at 11 Salisbury Road in south Edinburgh.

He died 8 August 1852 and is buried in New Calton Cemetery along with his wife, Jane, son Alexander and other family members.
