= North Dakota Fighting Hawks basketball =

Two North Dakota Fighting Hawks basketball programs are part of the school's athletics program:

- North Dakota Fighting Hawks men's basketball
- North Dakota Fighting Hawks women's basketball
