= Paul Bryson =

English cricketer (born 1968)

Personal information
- Full name: Paul Robert John Bryson
- Born: 6 July 1968 (age 58); Liverpool, Lancashire, England
- Batting: Right-handed
- Bowling: Right-arm off break

Domestic team information
- Years: Team
- 1994–2002: Cheshire

Career statistics
Competition	List A
Matches	9
Runs scored	138
Batting average	17.25
100s/50s	–/1
Top score	59
Balls bowled	–
Wickets	–
Bowling average	–
5 wickets in innings	–
10 wickets in match	–
Best bowling	–
Catches/stumpings	3/–
- Source: Cricinfo, 13 April 2011

Paul Robert John Bryson (born 6 July 1968) is a former English cricketer. Bryson was a right-handed batsman who bowled right-arm off break. He was born in Liverpool, Lancashire.

Bryson made his debut for Cheshire in the 1994 Minor Counties Championship against Dorset. Bryson played Minor counties cricket for Cheshire from 1994 to 2001, including 51 Minor Counties Championship matches and 24 MCCA Knockout Trophy matches. In 1995, he made his List A debut against Essex in the NatWest Trophy. He played eight further List A matches for Cheshire, the last coming against Lincolnshire in the 2nd round of the 2003 Cheltenham & Gloucester Trophy which was held in 2002. In his nine List A matches, he scored 138 runs at a batting average of 17.25, with a single half century high score of 59 coming against Lincolnshire in 2002, with his steady half century coming from 84 balls before he was dismissed by Martyn Dobson.

He played Second XI cricket for the Lancashire Second XI in 1995.
