= Bryson (given name) =

Bryson is a given name which may refer to:

== People ==
- Bryson of Achaea (fl. c. 330 BC), ancient Greek philosopher
- Bryson of Heraclea (c. 450 – c. 390 BC), ancient Greek mathematician and sophist
- Bryson Albright (born 1994), American football linebacker
- Bryson Baugus (born 1994), American voice actor for English dubs of Japanese anime
- Bryson Burroughs (1869–1934), American painter and curator of paintings at the Metropolitan Museum of Art
- Bryson Daily (born c. 2003), American football player
- Bryson DeChambeau (born 1993), American golfer
- Bryson Eason (born 2002), American football player
- Bryson Fonville (born 1994), American basketball player
- Bryson Foster (born 2000), teen activist for development of treatments for muscular dystrophy
- Bryson Goodwin (born 1985), Australian rugby league player
- Bryson Graham (1952–1993), English rock drummer
- Bryson Green (born 2002), American football player
- Bryson Head (born 1995), Australian politician
- Bryson Keeton (born 1993), American football cornerback
- Bryson Kelly (born 1989), American football player
- Bryson Kuzdzal (born 2005), American football player
- Bryson Joseph Louis (1925–2022), Dominican politician
- Bryson Nesbit (born 2002), American football player
- Bryson Potts (born 2002), American rapper known as NLE Choppa
- Bryson Rash (1913–1992), American journalist and White House correspondent
- Bryson Stott (born 1997), American Major League Baseball player
- Bryson Tiller (born 1993), American musician and rapper
- Bryson Warren (born 2004), American basketball player
- Bryson Washington, American football player

== Fictional characters ==
- Bryson Bale, in the Marvel Comics Universe
