= E. Brent Bryson =

American lawyer (born 1957)

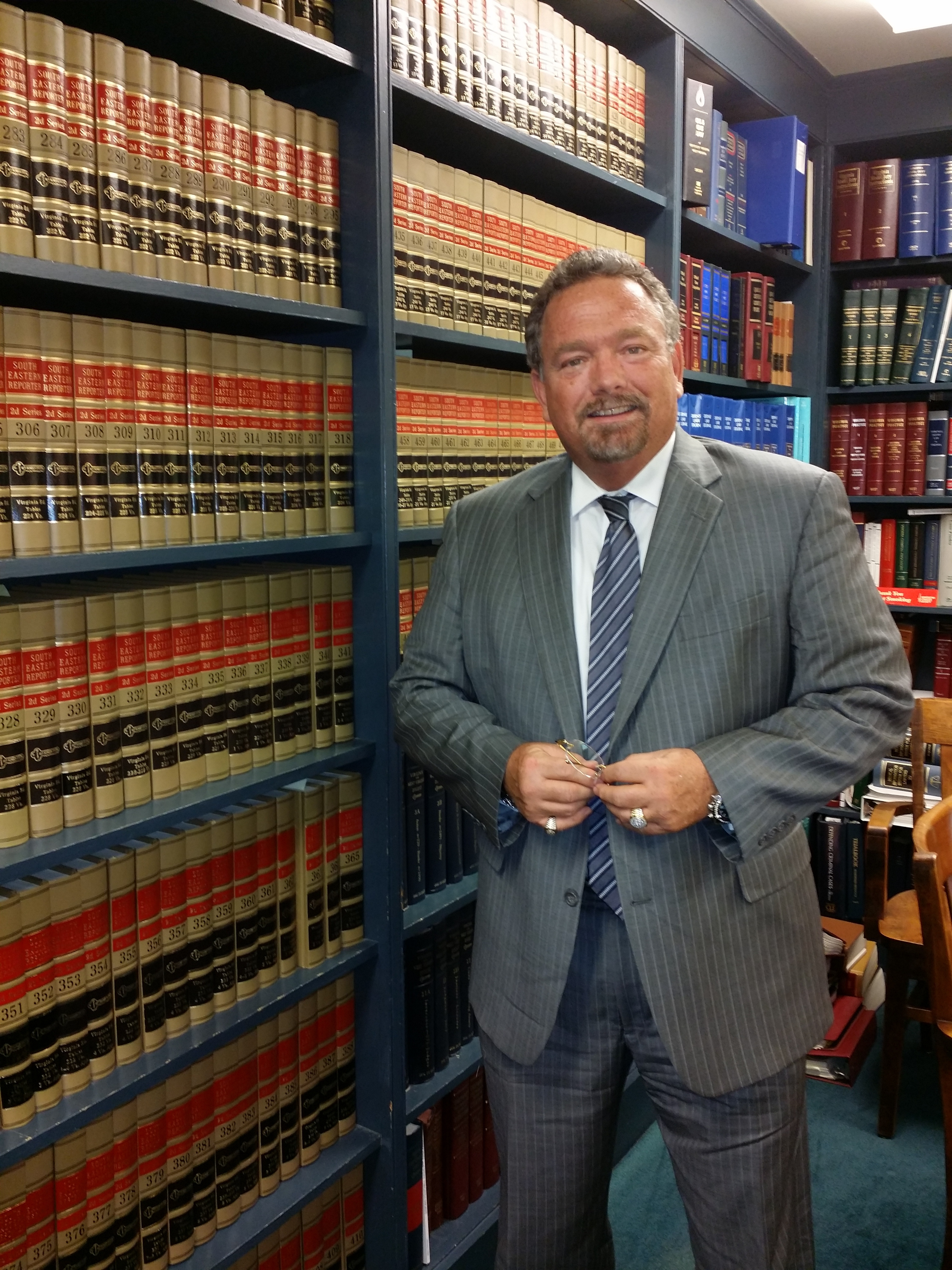

E. Brent Bryson is a criminal defense attorney who was involved in the O. J. Simpson robbery case.

Bryson is a nationally recognized criminal defense and civil rights attorney who is a solo practitioner in Las Vegas, Nevada. Bryson was born in Wise County, Virginia on June 19, 1957. From the age of 12, he grew up in Tucson, Arizona where his father taught him to play the trumpet. During his youth and early adulthood, Bryson was a professional trumpet player and singer that toured throughout the country. In 1982, while on tour with his band, Bryson was involved in a bar fight at the club where his band was playing in Casper, Wyoming. The person that started the fight (Roche Boyles) was injured during the fight and subsequently died. As a result of the fight, Bryson was criminally charged and ultimately stood trial for manslaughter. He was found not guilty by reason of accident and self-defense by way of a jury trial. The experience of being on trial changed Bryson's outlook on life and he left his musical career and embarked upon a career in law. Since settling in Las Vegas and pursuing a career as an attorney, Bryson has conducted jury and non-jury trials in the State and Federal Courts of Nevada at all Court levels. Bryson is also admitted to practice before the United States Supreme Court, the Nevada Supreme Court and the Ninth Circuit Court of Appeals. Bryson was voted one of the Top 100 Lawyers in Las Vegas for 2017 and was inducted into the prestigious “Presidents Circle” in the “Who's Who Top Attorneys of North America” for the years 2018–2019.

Bryson obtained on behalf of his clients one of the largest settlements against a law enforcement entity in the history of the State of Nevada. Bryson also won the only civil jury verdict against a hotel and casino arising out of the 2002 melee at the Laughlin River Run between the Hells Angels and Mongols motorcycle clubs. The Laughlin River Run case was used by the American Trial Lawyers Association of South Carolina as a “mock” case to teach other lawyers on how to try a case.

Bryson was also lead Plaintiffs’ counsel in a case against the Appalachian School of Law that drew both National and International attention involving the shooting and killing of students and faculty by a disgruntled former student.

Bryson represented O. J. Simpson’s co-defendant Clarence Stewart in the infamous criminal trial regarding Simpson's attempted recovery of property in Nevada and successfully appealed Mr. Stewart's conviction.

Bryson has also argued successfully before both the Nevada Supreme Court and the Ninth Circuit Court of Appeals. He has successfully opposed two Writs of Certiorari filed by Law Enforcement entities before the United States Supreme Court. Bryson received his B.A. Degree from the University of Arizona and his J.D. Degree from Whittier College School of Law. Bryson is a current or former member of the Clark County and American Bar Associations, the State Bar of Nevada, the National Association of Criminal Defense Lawyers, the Supreme Court Historical Society, and the Association of Trial Lawyers of America. Bryson has appeared on newscasts around the world, including CBS, ABC, FOX 5, CNN, Court TV, MSNBC and Telemundo News. He has also appeared on numerous television shows, including In Session, Tru TV's Most Shocking Court Videos, the Johnnie Cochran Show, Good Morning America, and Inside Edition. Additionally, he has been a frequent commentator for television. Mr. Bryson has lectured and written in the areas of trial advocacy, deposition strategy and police liability.
