= John Bryson (Canadian politician) =

Canadian politician

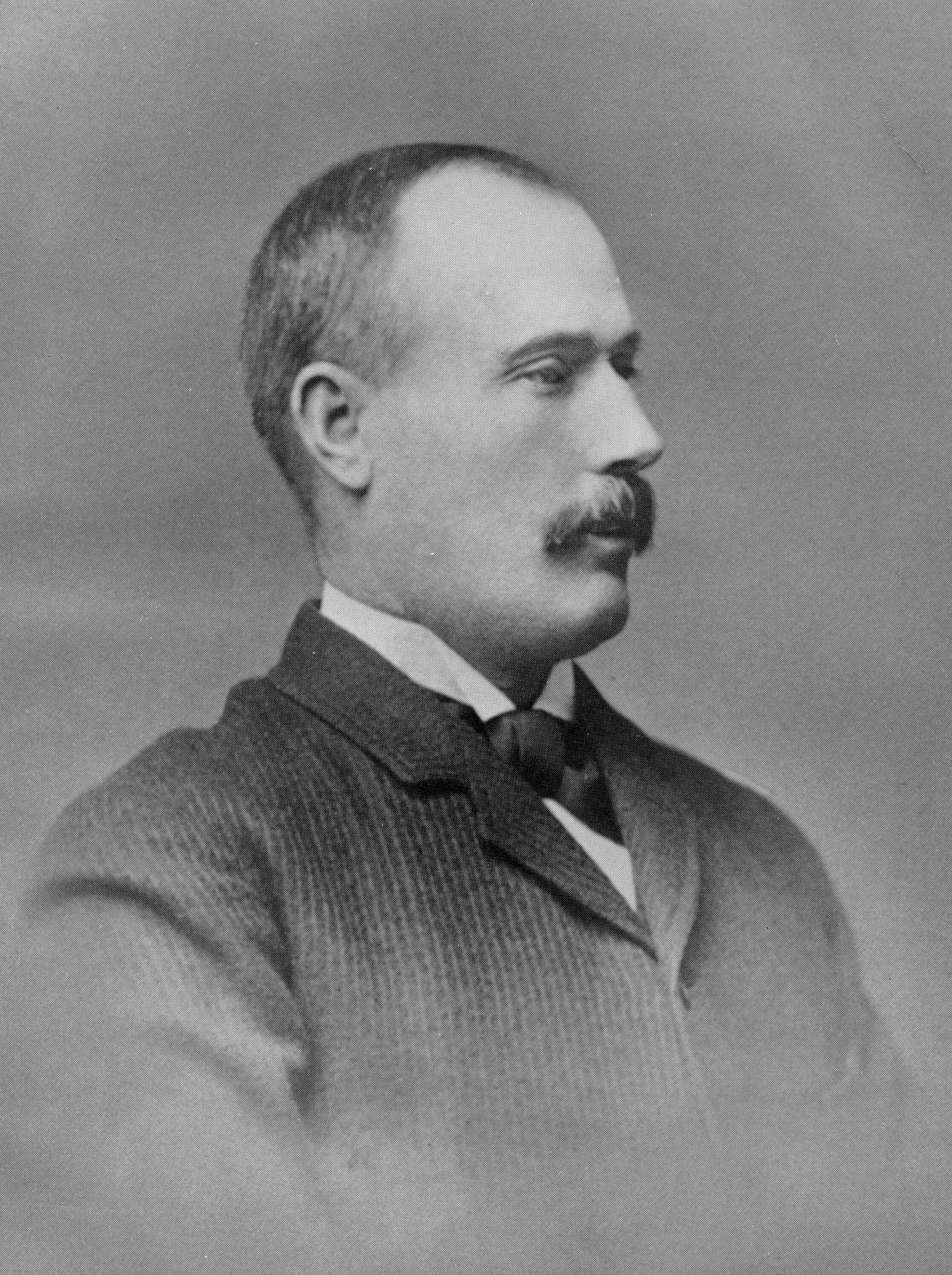

John Bryson (November 30, 1849 – January 20, 1896) was a Quebec lumberman, farmer and political figure. He represented Pontiac in the House of Commons of Canada from 1882 to 1891 and from 1892 to 1896 as a Conservative Party of Canada member.

He was born in Fort Coulonge, Canada East, the son of George Bryson, Sr. and Robina Cobb. In 1874, he married Mary, the daughter of Thomas Bryson. Bryson was mayor of Mansfield-et-Pontefract from 1882 to 1889 and mayor of Fort Coulonge from 1889 to 1890. He was defeated when he ran for reelection provincially in 1891 by Thomas Murray but, following an appeal of the election results, won the by-election held in 1892. Bryson died in office at the age of 46.

His brother George served as a member of the province's Legislative Council.

1891 Canadian federal election: Pontiac
Party	Candidate	Votes	%	±%
Liberal	Thomas Murray	1,100	41.01	+4.52
Unknown	H.M. McLean	795	29.64	
Conservative	John Bryson	787	29.34	-34.16
Total valid votes		2,682	100.00	

1887 Canadian federal election: Pontiac
Party	Candidate	Votes	%	±%
Conservative	John Bryson	1,681	63.51	+17.40
Liberal	Thomas Craig	966	36.49	
Total valid votes		2,647	100.00	

1882 Canadian federal election: Pontiac
Party	Candidate	Votes	%	±%
Conservative	John Bryson	1,047	46.10	-7.95
Unknown	N. McCuaig	931	41.00	
Unknown	W. Somerville	293	12.90	
Total valid votes		2,271	100.00	
