= Dorothee Manski =

German-born American soprano (1892–1967)

- Born: Dorothee Auguste Friederike Mansky; March 11, 1892 (Note: according to her birth certificate, registry office Berlin Charlottenburg No. 450 from March 15, 1892.); Berlin, Germany
- Died: February 24, 1967 (aged 74) (Note: Her age when she died was given as 72 in an obituary which does not match either birth date.); Atlanta, Georgia, U.S.
- Occupations: Operatic soprano; Academic teacher
- Organizations: Berlin Court Opera; Metropolitan Opera; Jacobs School of Music
- Spouse: Walter Bransen

Dorothee Manski (March 11, 1892 – February 24, 1967) was a German-born American operatic soprano and voice teacher. She appeared at the Metropolitan Opera in 335 performances, and took leading roles internationally, such as Wagner's Isolde at the Salzburg Festival.

== Career ==
Dorothee Manski grew up in Berlin. She studied there at the Prox School and the Conservatory of Music with Emmy Raabe-Burg. She made her operatic debut in her hometown at the Court Opera, where she was a member for the 1913/14 season. Among her early roles were Tebaldo in Verdi's Don Carlos and the First Esquire when Wagner's Parsifal was first performed at the house. From 1914 to 1919, she also sang at the Nationaltheater Mannheim, including the title role of Sharazade by Bernhard Sekles in 1917. She performed at the Staatsoper Stuttgart from 1919 to 1921, and then returned to Berlin, where she sang at the State Opera from 1922 to 1926. She appeared as Eurydice in Offenbach's Orpheus in der Unterwelt, directed by Max Reinhardt.

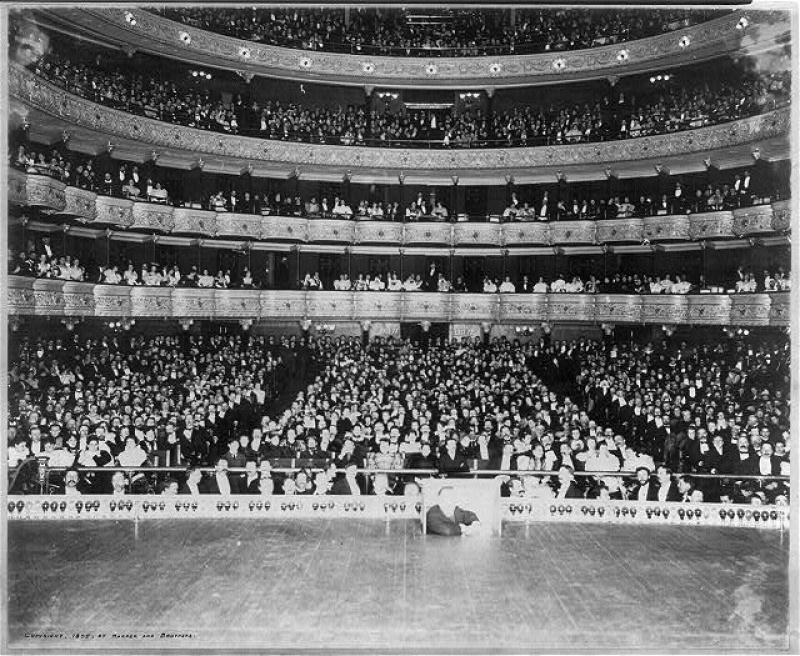
Interior of the Metropolitan Opera House on Broadway

In 1927, she performed for the Metropolitan Opera for the first time, as the Witch in Humperdinck's Hänsel and Gretel on November 5. She remained with the company until 1941, during which time she sang in 335 performances. Her major roles there included both Elsa and Ortrud in Wagner's Lohengrin, Venus in Tannhäuser, Gutrune in Götterdämmerung, Chrysothemis in Elektra by Richard Strauss, Herodias in Salome, Marianne Leitmetzerin in Der Rosenkavalier, and Giulietta in Offenbach's The Tales of Hoffmann. In 1933, she stepped in for Frida Leider as Brünnhilde in Wagner's Die Walküre. During her time at the Met she was a pupil of voice teacher Estelle Liebling, the teacher of Beverly Sills.

She appeared as a guest at the San Francisco Opera between 1931 and 1937, as the Witch, Herodias, and as Freia, Gutrune and several other roles in Wagner's Der Ring des Nibelungen. In 1933 and 1934 she was invited to the Salzburg Festival by Bruno Walter to appear as Isolde in Wagner's Tristan und Isolde, a role which she also sang at the Vienna State Opera in September 1934. She was also a guest at the Chicago Opera in 1938.

From 1942, Manski was professor of voice at the Indiana University in Bloomington, where she lived. Among her students at the Jacobs School of Music was Felicia Weathers.

Manski was married to the German physician, violinist and composer Walter Bransen. Their daughter Inge Manski (1920–2001) also became a successful singer. Manski died in Atlanta.

== Recording ==
Manski's voice appears as Freia and Gutrune in transcription recordings from the Metropolitan Opera between 1936 and 1941, conducted by Artur Bodanzky, alongside Friedrich Schorr as Wotan and Gunther, Marjorie Lawrence as Brünnhilde and Lauritz Melchior as Siegfried, which were reissued as CD.
