= John Bryson (RAF officer) =

Royal Air Force officer

John Samuel Bryson
- Born: John Samuel Bryson; 18 November 1912; Westmount, Quebec, Canada
- Died: 24 September 1940 (aged 27)
- Burial place: St Andrew's, North Weald Bassett, Essex
- Military career
- Allegiance: Canada
- Branch: Royal Air Force
- Service years: 1939 – 1940
- Rank: Pilot Officer
- Unit: No. 92 Squadron RAF
- Conflicts: World War II: Battle of Britain

Pilot Officer John Samuel Bryson (18 November 1912 – 24 September 1940), called "Butch", was a Canadian fighter pilot who flew with the Royal Air Force during the Battle of Britain.

Bryson, the son John Thompson Bryson and Marion Elphinstone Bryson (nee Samuel), was born on 18 November 1912 in Westmount an enclave of Montreal, Quebec, Canada. Prior to the war he was a member of the Royal Canadian Mounted Police, but bought his way out in order to serve in defence of Britain.

In January 1939 he joined the Royal Air Force on a short service commission. Upon completion of his flying training at No. 13 Flying Training school at RAF Drem, he was posted to No. 92 Squadron RAF. He joined the squadron at RAF Tangmere on 10 October 1939. He had one 'kill', an He 111 over Dunkirk on 2 June 1940, and shared a kill on 24 July 1940 of a Junkers Ju 88 over the Bristol Channel. Flying with the 92d out of Biggin Hill, joining two other squadrons in a Big Wing group, on 24 September 1940, in response to a ten Ju 88 medium bomber attack, defended by over one-hundred 109s, Bryson was "last seen making a solo attack on a large formation of Bf 109s". He was shot down and killed, his Spitfire, X4037, crashing and burning out near North Weald. Butch Bryson was 27 years old. He was buried in St Andrew's Church, North Weald Bassett, Essex.
