= Tyrone Brunson =

Tyrone Brunson may refer to:

- Tyrone Brunson (boxer) (born 1985), American boxer
- Tyrone Brunson (musician) (1956–2013), American singer and musician
