= Alexander Bryson =

Scottish biologist, geologist and horologist; (1816–1866)

- Born: 12 October 1816; 5 South Bridge, Edinburgh
- Died: 7 December 1866 (aged 50); Hawkhill House, Edinburgh
- Citizenship: United Kingdom
- Education: University of Edinburgh
- Scientific career
- Institutions: Partner, Robert Bryson & Sons, Clock and Watch-Maker, Edinburgh

Notes
- Father: Robert Bryson

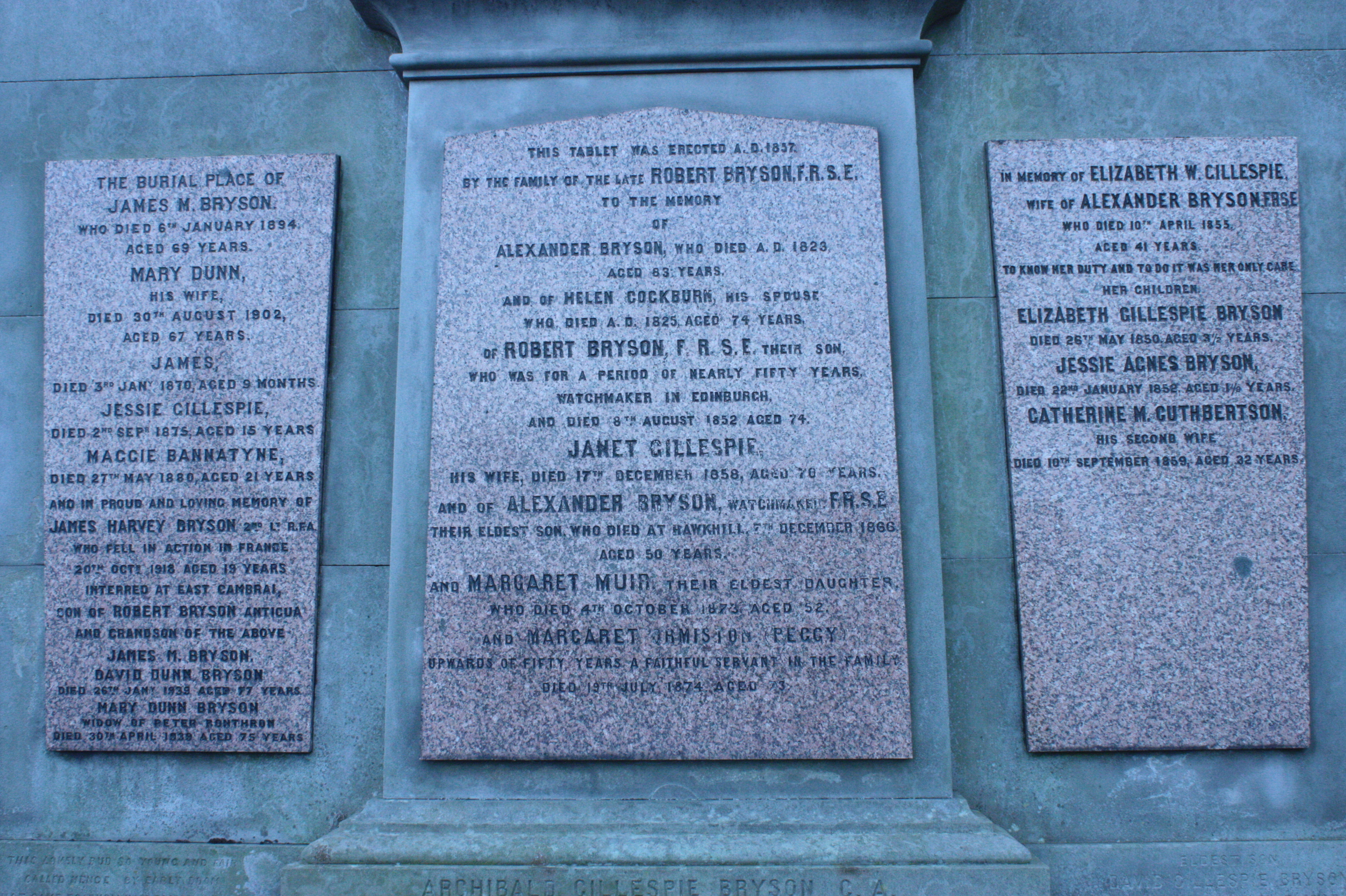
The Bryson family grave, New Calton Cemetery

Alexander Bryson FRSE FGS FRSSA FSAScot FRPSE (12 October 1816 – 7 December 1866) was a Scottish biologist, geologist and horologist who served as president of the Royal Scottish Society of Arts (1860–61) and as president of the Royal Physical Society of Edinburgh (1863).

== Life ==
He was born on 12 October 1816 in Edinburgh, the son of Janet Gillespie (1788-1858) and Robert Bryson FRSE (1778-1852), a watchmaker.

He attended the High School in Edinburgh then trained as a watchmaker and entered the family business, then renamed Robert Bryson & Son.

With his first wife, Elizabeth Waterstone Gillespie (possibly a cousin) he had two children who died in infancy, and a daughter and son (William Alexander Bryson) and died 10 April 1855 aged 44.

His second wife, Catherine McDonald Cuthbertson, also died young in September 1859, aged 32. Together they had a son. With his third wife, Jane Thomson, he had another son, Leonard Horner Bryson, who survived him and remarried.

He was President of the Society of Antiquaries of Scotland 1860–1861. He was President of the Royal Physical Society of Edinburgh in 1863. He was also a member of the Botanical Society of Edinburgh and the Edinburgh Geological Society.

In 1858 he was elected a Fellow of the Royal Society of Edinburgh. He was President of the Royal Scottish Society of the Arts 1860–61.

He died on 7 December 1866 at Hawkhill House, a country villa between Leith and Edinburgh. He is buried in New Calton Cemetery with his two wives next to his parents.

== Works ==
- On a Method of rendering Baily's Compensation Pendulum insensible to Hygrometric Influences (1854)
- On an improved method of preparing siliceous and other fossils for microscopic investigation: with a description of a new pneumatic chuck (1856)
- On a new method of measuring watch-glasses (1860)
- Memoir of Rev. John Fleming, D.D., F.R.S.E. (1861)
- Memoir of General Sir Thomas Makdougall Brisbane, G.C.B., & C. president of the Royal Society of Edinburgh (1861)
- Notes of a trip to Iceland in 1862 (1864)
