= Bryson Foster =

American actor

Bryson Foster is a noted teen activist who advocates and fundraises for the development of treatments for muscular dystrophy.

Born June 28, 2000, Foster was diagnosed with Duchenne muscular dystrophy at age five.

== As MDA Goodwill Ambassador ==
While attending a Muscular Dystrophy Association banquet at age nine, Foster asked if he could address the audience. "I was anxious because I had never done it before, but when I got up there I didn't want to stop," he recalled. To the surprise of his parents, Foster demonstrated a flair for communication; this in turn led to his choice as a national MDA Goodwill Ambassador (formerly known as an MDA Poster Child) for two consecutive years (2012 and 2013).

In this role, Foster appeared on the annual MDA telethon, by then called the MDA Show of Strength, visited numerous MDA corporate and business sponsors (including Lowe's and Harley-Davidson), and met many celebrities (including singers Taylor Swift, Pitbull, Faith Hill and Tim McGraw, among others). Foster also dealt frequently with the media and appeared in various MDA national promotional materials, including video public service announcements and MDA "shamrocks."

He has also served as MDA Goodwill Ambassador for the Charlotte, North Carolina, area.

"My favorite part of the job," explained Foster of his Goodwill Ambassador role, "is meeting new people and being able to thank the sponsors and supporters in person who help make an impact in the lives of people just like me. Every dollar and every cent really does count, and my mission is to have fun while spreading the word about MDA and its mission to help people living with muscle disease."

"Most kids my age don't come across opportunities like the ones I've had. . . ," he also observed. "I've experienced so many new things and met wonderful people along the way. I just want to keep speaking from my heart and doing what I love most to inspire people to support a cause that is close to me and my family."

== More recent activities ==
Foster remains active as an MDA fundraiser and independent MD spokesperson, participating in such fundraising efforts as "Muscle Team, Muscle Walk, Lock-Ups, Shamrocks, mobile kickoffs, Fill the Boot, golf tournaments and social events." His walk team, Bryson's Bikers, has raised tens of thousands of dollars for the MDA.

== Other interests ==
Foster's speaking skills resulted in a voice actor role in the app Little Ashby: Star Reporter, developed by “Entertainment Tonight” host and MDA National ALS Ambassador Nancy O'Dell. Foster performed the voice of child cameraperson "Arty."

A sports fan, Foster plans to pursue a career in sports, either as a football player, coach, or announcer.
