= Katherine Brunson =

Associate professor of archaeology

Katherine Brunson is an associate professor of archaeology, affiliated with the department of East Asian studies and College of the Environment, at Wesleyan University in Connecticut, USA. She is a zooarchaeologist with a geographical focus on China, specializing in the ritual aspects of animal domestication, ancient DNA, and the origins of pastoralism. She has a particular interest in bone artifact production and is currently researching the origins of Chinese domestic cattle, the relationship between domestic cattle and extinct East Asian wild aurochs.

Dr. Brunson's research also focuses on archaeological collections management and digital data publishing. She is currently co-directing the digital Oracle Bones in East Asia project on Open Context and spearheads the Environmental Archaeology Lab at Wesleyan University.

== Academic life ==
Dr. Katherine Brunson completed her B.A. in anthropology magna cum laude with highest honors at Harvard University in 2008, advised by notable Chinese archaeologist Rowan Flad (student of Lothar von Falkenhausen), making her the third generation scholar descendant of Kwang-chih Chang. She completed both her M.A. and PhD in anthropology at UCLA in 2011 and 2015 respectively. Dr. Brunson's PhD was advised by P. Jeffrey Brantingham.

After receiving her PhD in August 2015, she began work as a postdoctoral fellow at the Fairbank Center for Chinese Studies, Harvard University until July 2016. Brunson then took up an opportunity for postdoctoral fellow at the Brown University, Joukowsky Institute for Archaeology and the Ancient World, before assuming the position of visiting assistant professor of biomolecular archaeology until December 2019.

She has been an assistant professor of archaeology and East Asian studies at Wesleyan University since January 2020. In 2025, she was promoted to associate professor.

== Contributions ==
Katherine Brunson's main research focus is in Chinese zooarchaeology and the environmental impacts of animal domestication. Brunson directs Wesleyan's Environmental Archaeology Lab, where she works with undergraduate students on community outreach projects, 3D scanning of Wesleyan's unique collections, and management of Wesleyan's comparative osteology collections.

== Recent publications ==
- Brunson, K. and Lander, B. (2023) ‘Deer and Humans in the Early Farming Communities of the Yellow River Valley: A Symbiotic Relationship’, Human Ecology, 51(4), p. 609.
- Brunson, K. (2022) ‘Cattle and People in China: From the Neolithic to the Present’, Cattle and People: Interdisciplinary Approaches to an Ancient Relationship.
- Brunson, K. (2022) ‘Direct dating of the earliest domesticated cattle and caprines in northwestern China reveals the history of pastoralism in the Gansu-Qinghai region’, Journal of Archaeological Science.
- Brunson, K., Hein, A. and Womack, A. (2021) ‘Complex Pathways Towards Emergent Pastoral Settlements: New Research on the Bronze Age Xindian Culture of Northwest China’, Journal of World Prehistory.
- Brunson, K., Womack, A. and Hein, A. (2021) ‘The Majiayao to Qijia transition: exploring the intersection of technological and social continuity and change’, Asian Archaeology.
- Brunson, K. and Schneider, M. (2020) ‘A History of Pigs in China: From Curious Omnivores to Industrial Pork’, Journal of Asian Studies.
- Flad, R. and Brunson, K. (2020) ‘Zooarchaeology, ancient mtDNA, and radiocarbon dating provide new evidence for the emergence of domestic cattle and caprines in the Tao River Valley of Gansu Province, northwest China’, Journal of Archaeological Science: Reports.
