= L. Catherine Brinson =

American materials scientist

- Education: California Institute of Technology; Virginia Tech
- Scientific career
- Workplaces: Northwestern University; Duke University
- Thesis: Time-temperature response of multi-phase viscoelastic solids through numerical analysis (1990)
- Website: Brinson Lab

L. Catherine Brinson is an American materials scientist who is the Sharon C. and Harold L. Yoh, III Distinguished Professor at Duke University. Her research considers nanostructured polymers and shape-memory alloys. She was elected a Fellow of the American Association for the Advancement of Science in 2020.

== Early life and education ==
Brinson studied engineering and materials science at Virginia Tech. She spent her summer holidays working at the United States Naval Research Laboratory and Hercules Aerospace. She moved to the California Institute of Technology for her graduate studies, where she worked alongside Wolfgang Gustav Knauss on the time-temperature response of multi-phase viscoelastic solids. She completed her doctoral research in 1990, after which she visited Germany to work at the German Aerospace Center.

== Research and career ==
Brinson studies novel materials and the development of state-of-the-art characterisation techniques to better understand material behaviour. In 1992 she started her independent scientific career at Northwestern University. Here she focussed on the hierarchical structural properties of novel material systems, alongside serving as Associate Dean for Academic Initiatives and Chair of the Department of Mechanical Engineering. She combined computational models, data science and experimental research to further the development of new materials.

Brinson joined Duke University in 2017 as the Sharon C. and Harold L. Yoh, III Professor. Upon arriving at Duke, Brinson was awarded $5 million from the National Science Foundation to create an organized, searchable data repository on next-generation materials. She is developing the databases in collaboration with Cynthia Rudin, Deborah McGuinness and Chiara Daraio. The database includes materials such as polymer nanocomposities and structural metamaterials, along with analytical and predictive software to help accelerate the design and discovery of new materials. The nanocomposites developed by Brinson incorporate nanoparticles and nanotubes, and find application in several industries, from cars to advanced sporting equipment. The two frameworks designed by Brinson include NanoMine and MetaMine, which extract data from scientific papers, visualise and compare data, They make use of machine learning to understand the fundamental properties of materials.

In 2019, Brinson was named Chair of Mechanical Engineering & Materials Science at Duke University.

== Awards and honours ==
- 2006 Alexander von Humboldt Foundation Friedrich Wilhelm Bessel Prize
- 2007 Elected Fellow of the Society for Engineering Science
- 2013 Elected Fellow of the American Academy of Mechanics
- 2014 American Society of Mechanical Engineers Nadai Medal
- 2020 Elected Fellow of the American Association for the Advancement of Science

== Selected publications ==
- Brinson, L. C. (2016-07-27). "One-Dimensional Constitutive Behavior of Shape Memory Alloys: Thermomechanical Derivation with Non-Constant Material Functions and Redefined Martensite Internal Variable". Journal of Intelligent Material Systems and Structures. 4 (2): 229–242. doi:10.1177/1045389X9300400213. S2CID 122098025.
- Ramanathan, T.; Abdala, A. A.; Stankovich, S.; Dikin, D. A.; Herrera-Alonso, M.; Piner, R. D.; Adamson, D. H.; Schniepp, H. C.; Chen, X.; Ruoff, R. S.; Brinson, L. C. (2008-06-11). "Functionalized graphene sheets for polymer nanocomposites". Nature Nanotechnology. 3 (6): 327–331. Bibcode:2008NatNa...3..327R. doi:10.1038/nnano.2008.96. ISSN 1748-3395. PMID 18654541.
- Compton, Owen C.; Dikin, Dmitriy A.; Putz, Karl W.; Brinson, L. Catherine; Nguyen, SonBinh T. (2010-02-23). "Electrically Conductive "Alkylated" Graphene Paper via Chemical Reduction of Amine-Functionalized Graphene Oxide Paper". Advanced Materials. 22 (8): 892–896. Bibcode:2010AdM....22..892C. doi:10.1002/adma.200902069. ISSN 0935-9648. PMID 20217812. S2CID 32648713.

=== Books ===
- Brinson, H. F. (24 January 2015). Polymer engineering science and viscoelasticity : an introduction. Brinson, L. C. (L. Catherine) (Second ed.). New York. ISBN 978-1-4899-7485-3. OCLC 900780649.
