= William Bryson (minister) =

Irish Presbyterian minister

- Born: 1730
- Died: 6 May 1815 (aged 84–85)
- Occupation: Presbyterian minister

William Bryson (1730 – 6 May 1815) was an Irish Presbyterian minister.

== Biography ==
Bryson was said to have come of a Donegal family, became minister of the nonsubscribing congregation at Antrim in August 1764. Without the pulpit reputation of his cousin James, he was a man of more influence in matters theological. He adopted Arian Christology and rejected the tenets of original sin and imputed righteousness. The ground he took was that of a strong scripturalist, and he upheld sabbath observance, eternal punishments, and Satanic agency. Bryson, though a member of the outcast Antrim presbytery, was, as his manuscripts show, a frequent preacher in neighbouring congregations of the general synod. His first publication was a funeral discourse for a distinguished minister of the synod. At the time of the rebellion in 1798 Bryson was a staunch loyalist, in this, as in other matters, following the lead of his co-presbyter, Bruce of Belfast. In September 1809 his age and infirmities rendered him desirous of resigning his pastorate, but as his people could not agree upon a successor, he did not do so till November 1810. He died on 6 May 1815, in his eighty-sixth year. He is said to have been buried at Antrim, but his name is not on the family tombstone. In the vestry of the First Presbyterian Church, Belfast, hangs a likeness of Bryson, copied by his son Patrick from a silhouette taken in his forty-sixth year. When about that age he married a daughter of Alexander Maclaine, M.A., minister at Antrim, 1742–59, and granddaughter of John Abernethy, by whom he had six children. His daughters kept school at Antrim for many years.

Bryson published:

- The Practice of Righteousness, productive of happiness both at present and for ever, Belfast, 1782, funeral sermon, Isaiah xxxii. 17, at Crumlin, 28 July, for Thomas Crawford, ordained at Crumlin, 1723, or early in 1724.
- The Duty of Searching the Scriptures, Belfast, 1786, (sermon, John v. 39), at ordination in Ballyclare, 9 Feb. 1786, of Futt Marshall, died 23 Oct. 1813, aged 58.
- Funeral Sermon for Rev. Robert Sinclair of Larne (said to have been published, but not known; Sinclair died on 20 Feb. 1795, aged 70).
