= Thomas Bryson =

Canadian politician

Thomas Bryson (c. 1826 – January 4, 1882) was a Quebec merchant and political figure. He represented Pontiac in the Legislative Assembly of Quebec from 1881 to 1882 as a Conservative member.

He was born in Perth, Upper Canada, the son of James Bryson and Jane Cochrane. He married Jane Fumerton around 1850. Bryson was mayor of Mansfield and Pontefract from 1878 to 1881. He operated a store at Fort Coulonge. He died in office in 1882 without ever taking his seat in the provincial legislature.

Bryson's brother George was also elected to the legislative assembly and was a member of the legislative council. His daughter Mary married his nephew John Bryson.
