= George Bryson Jr. =

Canadian politician

George Bryson, Jr.
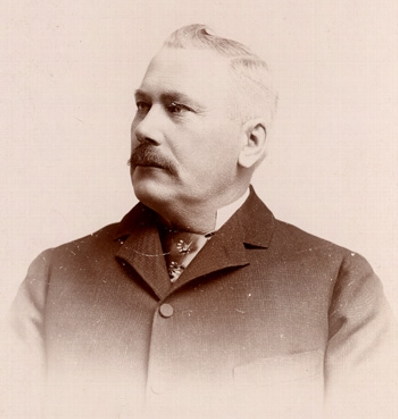

Member of the Legislative Council of Quebec for Inkerman
- In office 1887–1937
- Preceded by: George Bryson, Sr.
- Succeeded by: Charles Allan Smart

Personal details
- Born: July 20, 1852 Fort-Coulonge, Canada East
- Died: May 8, 1937 (aged 84) Ottawa, Ontario
- Party: Liberal
- Relations: George Bryson, Sr., father John Bryson, brother Jane Pitfield, great-granddaughter

George Bryson (July 20, 1852 – May 8, 1937) was a Quebec lumber merchant and political figure. He served as a member of the Legislative Council of Quebec for Inkerman division from 1887 to 1937 as a Liberal member.

He was born in Fort-Coulonge, the son of George Bryson and Robina Cobb, and was educated at the British American Commercial College in Toronto and the Montreal Military College. Bryson was a director for the Bank of Ottawa (later the Bank of Nova Scotia). In 1875, he married Helen, the daughter of James Craig, an Ontario MPP. Bryson was mayor of Mansfield and Pontefract from 1891 to 1892 and from 1894 to 1895. He was named a minister without portfolio in the province's cabinet in 1931 and became government leader for the Legislative Council in 1932. He died in office in Ottawa at the age of 84.
