= Jimmy Branston =

English footballer

Personal information
- Full name: James Hart Branston
- Date of birth: 22 February 1894
- Place of birth: Sutton-in-Ashfield, England
- Date of death: 1970 (aged 85–86)
- Position: Goalkeeper

Senior career*
Years	Team	Apps	(Gls)
1913–1914	Grimsby Town	0	(0)
1914–1915	Sutton Junction		
1919–1922	Rotherham County	111	(0)
1922–1927	Preston North End	129	(0)
Total		240	(0)
- * Club domestic league appearances and goals

James Hart Branston (5 July 1879–1954) was an English footballer who played in the Football League for Preston North End and Rotherham County.
