= James Bryson =

Irish Presbyterian minister

- Born: 1730?
- Died: 3 October 1796
- Occupation: Presbyterian minister

James Bryson (1730 – 3 October 1796) was an Irish Presbyterian minister.

== Biography ==
Bryson son of John Bryson, who died at Holywood, County Down, on 23 November 1788, aged (according to his tombstone) 103 years, is said to have belonged to a family originally connected with co. Donegal. His first sermon was preached at Newtownards, co. Down, 26 April 1760. He was licensed by the Armagh presbytery at Clare, co. Armagh, 1 June 1762. After preaching for over a year at Banbridge in 1763-4 he was ordained minister of Lisburn by Bangor presbytery on 7 June 1764, subscribing a cautious formulary, in general approval of the Westminster Confession. He soon acquired the repute of an able preacher. A new meeting-house, built for him, was opened 18 May 1766. While it was constructing the use of the cathedral church was rented to his congregation between church hours. In 1773 he accepted a call to the second congregation of Belfast, stipulating that the congregation should retain its connection with the general synod, a tie which then demanded no express dogmatic bond. In 1778 he was elected moderator of the general synod which met at Lurgan. Bryson was a. freemason, and frequently preached before lodges, both in his own and other meeting-houses, and in churches of the establishment. His printed sermon of 24 June 1782 was preacher before ‘the Orange Lodge of Belfast, No. 257.’ The existing Orange Society, an offshoot of masonry, first appears as a distinct institution in 1795. Some scandal arose respecting Bryson’s private life. It does not appear that the matter came before the church courts, but Bryson retired from the second congregation, taking with him a following. His friends set about constructing a small meeting-house for him in Donegal Street, and during its erection, for about two years and eight months, he was allowed to preach in the parish church. It does not appear that his ministry continued to flourish, for on 29 Nov. 1795 he notes: ‘A regiment of Highlanders present, and very few more.’ He died on Monday, 3 October 1796. His portrait was bequeathed by his last surviving daughter to the fourth congregation. He was twice married.

Bryson published ‘Sermons on several important subjects,' Belfast, 1778, 8vo (dedicated to his cousin, William Bryson (the subscription list is of much local interest); and some other single sermons. Thirteen volumes of his manuscript sermons (vol. 1. is missing) were deposited by his grandson Joseph (son of an apothecary) in the Antrim Presbytery Library, now at Queen’s College, Belfast.
