= Yale Galanter =

American lawyer (born 1956)

- Born: Yale Lance Galanter; December 3, 1956 (age 69); Cherry Hill, New Jersey, U.S.
- Education: University of Miami; Nova Southeastern University
- Occupations: Lawyer, legal commentator
- Known for: Defense lawyer of O. J. Simpson
- Spouse: Elyse Cole Galanter (m. 1998)

Yale Lance Galanter (born December 3, 1956) is an American lawyer and legal commentator. He is best known for representing O. J. Simpson through his 2008 Las Vegas robbery case.

== Early life, education and early career ==
Galanter was born to a Jewish family in Cherry Hill, New Jersey. Galanter first wanted to become a professional golfer, but then he studied law at the University of Miami and Shepard Broad Law Center at Nova Southeastern University. He worked as a state prosecutor in Florida at the Miami-Dade State Attorney's Office under future United States attorney general Janet Reno.

== Notable clients ==
=== O. J. Simpson ===
Galanter first represented O. J. Simpson in a road rage trial in October 2001. He was also Simpson's attorney for the federal drug raid case on Simpson's home in 2001, a misdemeanor boating violation in 2002, a domestic violence call to his residence in 2003, and his writing of a fictional account of the murders of his former wife, Nicole Brown Simpson, and her friend, Ronald Goldman, called If I Did It: Confessions of the Killer.

Galanter also represented Simpson in Nevada v. Simpson, et al. in which his client was charged with twelve felony counts including conspiracy, robbery, and kidnapping relating to an armed robbery which took place in a guest room (#1203) at the Palace Station Hotel in Las Vegas on September 13, 2007. Simpson and co-defendant Charles "C.J." Stewart were convicted on October 3, 2008, on all counts at the conclusion of a month-long jury trial held in Department 5 of the 8th District Court, Clark County, Nevada, in Las Vegas, Nevada. Upon his conviction, bail was revoked and the 61-year-old Simpson was remanded by District Judge Jackie Glass to the Clark County Detention Center pending sentencing, which took place on December 5, 2008, when Simpson was given terms of incarceration in the Nevada State Prison system totaling a maximum thirty-three years.

=== Brooke Mueller ===
Galanter has represented Brooke Mueller for many years as her lawyer and spokesperson. Galanter most recently defended Mueller in her December 3, 2011 arrest for assault, possession of cocaine and distribution of cocaine in Aspen, Colorado. Galanter was able to obtain dismissals of the assault and distribution charges and had Mueller placed on deferred prosecution which when successfully completed will have all charges against Mueller dismissed. Galanter instituted a lawsuit against the Canyon's Drug Rehab Facility for negligent supervision and violating Brooke Mueller's privacy rights when one of their employees attempted to sell medical records to an electronic media tabloid site.

=== Charlie Sheen ===
Since 2009, Galanter represented Charlie Sheen starting with his arrest in Aspen, Colorado where Sheen was accused of aggravated assault on his wife, Brooke Mueller. Galanter negotiated a plea that ensured Sheen would receive no jail time. That plea deal caused Sheen to praise Galanter by calling him a "Rock Star" when leaving the Pitkin County courthouse on the day his plea was entered. Galanter continued to represent Sheen after the Pitkin County case and speaking on his behalf on numerous talk shows. Galanter again represented Sheen in the Plaza Hotel incident in New York City successfully ensuring that Capri Anderson's claims were dismissed by the police and having no charges brought against him.

== Media coverage ==
Numerous articles have been written about Yale Galanter and his high-profile clients. He has been featured in The New York Times, The New Yorker, Playboy, Aventura Magazine, and Vanity Fair. He is frequently mentioned and quoted on TMZ, Radar Online, PerezHilton.com, People, and E! News. Galanter has been quoted in every major newspaper in the country including The Los Angeles Times, The New York Times, The Washington Post, The Las Vegas Review-Journal, The Chicago Tribune.

== Legal commentary ==
Yale Galanter is a frequent guest on many of the nation's top news shows being asked to offer legal commentary on some of the nation's most high-profile cases. Galanter has appeared on the Today Show (NBC), Good Morning America ABC, CBS This Morning, On The Record with Greta Van Susteren FOX, The O'Reilly Factor, Hannity & Colmes, Nancy Grace, Show Biz Tonight Headline News, The Joy Behar Show, Larry King Live, CNN, Piers Morgan Tonight, Court TV, and TruTV.

== Awards and affiliations ==
- 2012 Distinguished Alumni Award Nova Southeastern University
- Legal Member of the Florida Bar Member of the Trial Bar
- Federal District Bar
- Southern District of Florida U. S. Supreme Court member

== Personal life ==
Galanter married Elyse Cole Galanter, a former court reporter, in November 1998.
