= George Bryson Sr. =

Canadian politician

George Bryson

Member of the Legislative Council of Quebec for Inkerman
- In office 1867–1887
- Succeeded by: George Bryson Jr.

Personal details
- Born: December 13, 1813 Paisley, Scotland
- Died: January 13, 1900 (aged 86) Fort-Coulonge, Quebec, Canada
- Party: Conservative
- Relations: Thomas Bryson (brother), Jane Pitfield (great-great granddaughter)
- Children: John, George

George Bryson (December 13, 1813 – January 13, 1900) was a Scottish-born businessman and political figure in Quebec.

He was born in Paisley, the son of James Bryson and Jane Cochrane, and came to Upper Canada with his parents in 1821. In 1835, he moved to the area near Fort-Coulonge in Lower Canada, where he entered the timber trade. In 1845, he married Robina Cobb. Bryson was mayor of Mansfield-et-Pontefract from 1855 to 1857 and from 1862 to 1867. He also served as justice of the peace, postmaster for Fort Coulonge and warden for Pontiac County. In 1857, he was elected to represent Pontiac in the Legislative Assembly of the Province of Canada in a by-election held after the death of John Egan, but the assembly was dissolved before he took his seat. Bryson was defeated in the general election that followed in 1858. In 1867, he was named to the province's Legislative Council for Inkerman division. He helped establish the Bank of Ottawa, later serving as a director, and promoted the development of railway links in the region. Bryson retired from politics in 1887 and died in Fort-Coulonge at the age of 86.

His brother Thomas was elected to the legislative assembly. Bryson's son John served in the House of Commons and his son George also served in the province's Legislative Council.

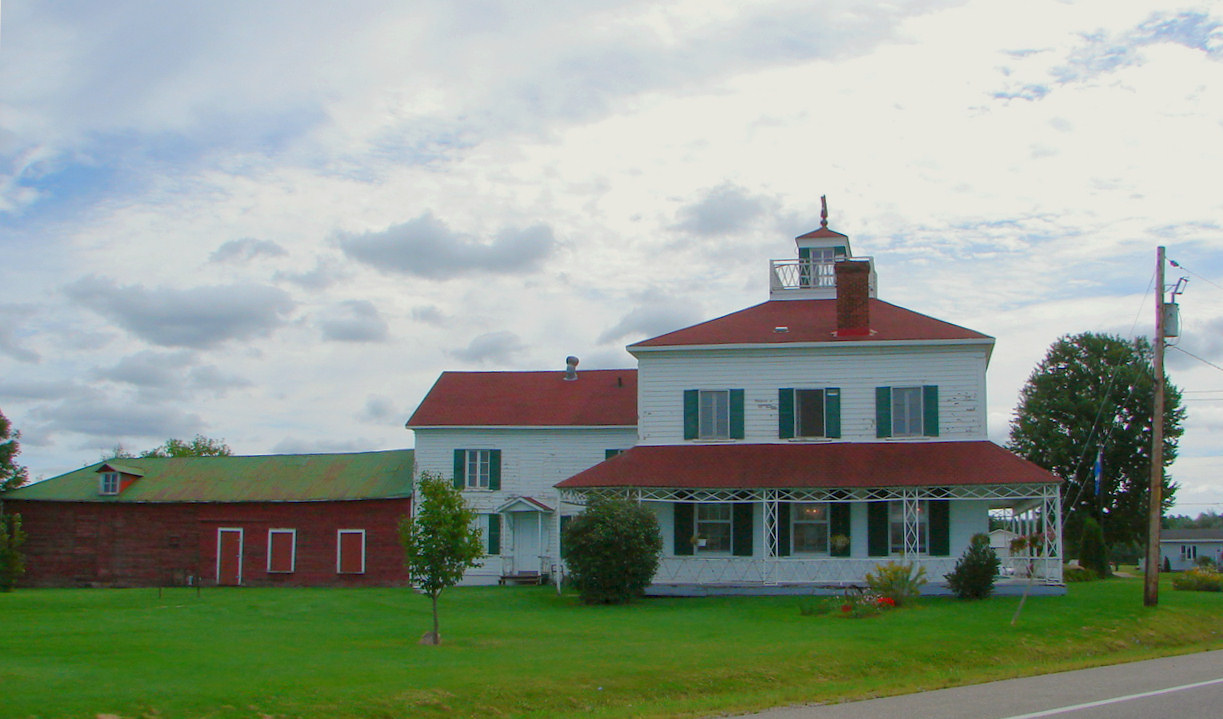
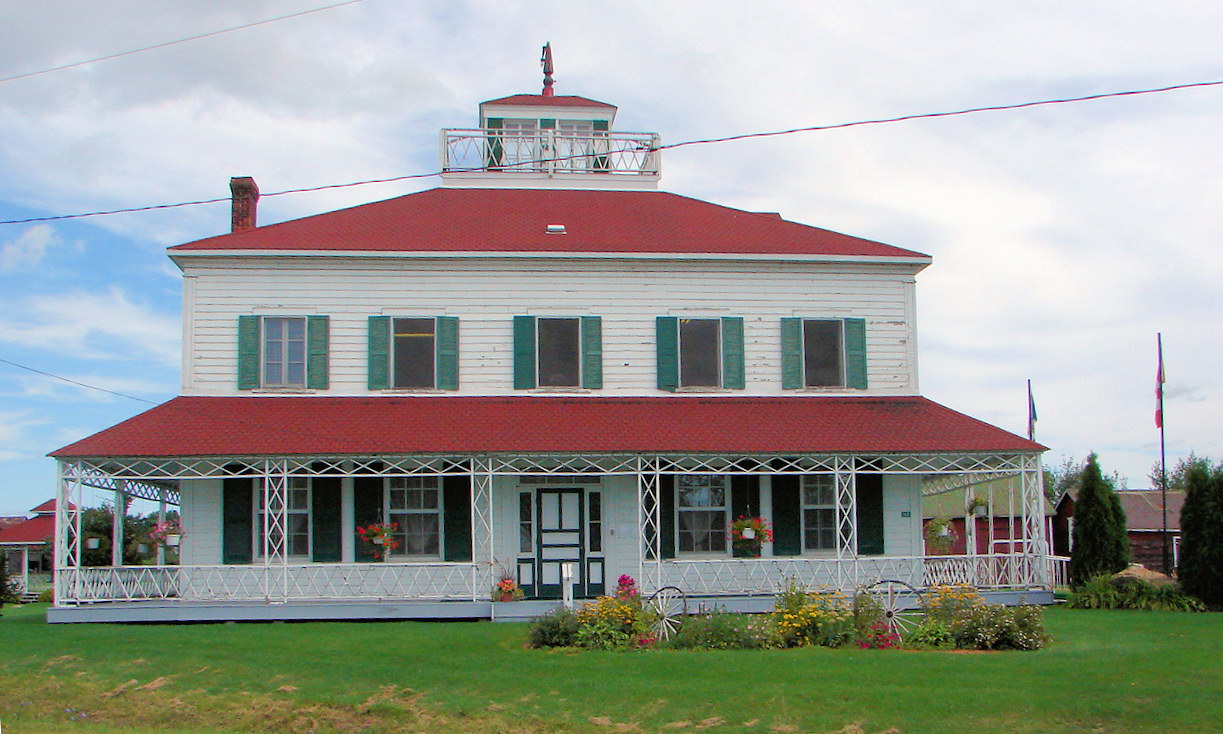
The Bryson House, built by George Bryson in the 19th century and declared a Quebec historical site in 1980. The house is unique in that it is built in wood as opposed to stone. It mixes various architectural styles: Georgian, with Greek Revival details and a Victorian style veranda. Today it is a museum and library.
