= Barnabé Brisson (engineer) =

French engineer and mathematician (1777–1828)

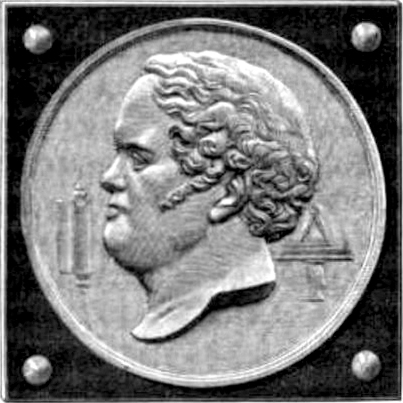
- Born: 11 October 1777; Lyon
- Died: 25 September 1828 (aged 50); Nevers
- Occupations: Engineer; Mathematician

Barnabé Brisson (11 October 1777 – 25 September 1828) was a French engineer and mathematician. He collaborated in the construction of the Canal de Saint-Quentin and other navigable waterways connected to the Escaut River. He also authored a number of academic publications on the canal systems.

== Notes ==
- MacTutor History of Mathematics archive: Biography of Barnabé Brisson
