= Harrison A. Bronson =

American judge (1873–1947)

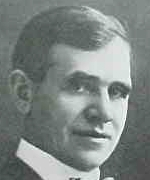
Harrison A. Bronson

Harrison A. Bronson (November 19, 1873 – April 22, 1947) was an American legislator and attorney who served as a justice of the Supreme Court of North Dakota from 1918 to 1924. He died at the age of 73 in 1947.

Born in Nunica, Michigan, Bronson received a B.A. from the University of North Dakota in 1894 and an M.A. from the same institution the following year. He received a law degree from the University of Minnesota in 1901. From 1913 to 1917, he was a member of the North Dakota State Senate. He won election to the state supreme court in 1918, beginning his term early due to a vacancy by the resignation of Justice Andrew A. Bruce in December 1918.
