= Bryson High School (Greenville, South Carolina) =

Location
- Greenville, South Carolina; United States
- Coordinates: 34.7183965°N 82.2489475°W

Information
- Established: 3 September 1954
- Closed: February 1970
- School district: Greenville County School District
- Principal: Dr. A.M. Anderson
- Campus size: 86 acres (35 ha)
- Last updated: 30 December 2017

Bryson High School was a segregated high school for African American students in Greenville, South Carolina operated by Greenville County School District. It opened its doors on September 3, 1954. It ceased operation as a segregated high school in 1970.

== History ==
Bryson High School began operations in 1954 with 567 students in grades 7-12. The school was named in honor of Joseph Raleigh Bryson who had served as a member of the South Carolina House of Representatives as a representative for Greenville County; he served from 1939 until his death in 1953. Dr. A.M. Anderson was the first principal of the new school. The new Bryson High School was located at the old P. Meadors homestead on approximately 86 acres (35 ha). The Greenville County School District bought the land on December 1, 1952, for nine thousand dollars. Construction was completed in about two years. The new school consisted of a main hall, gymnasium, related-arts wing, cafeteria, and an auditorium.

February 13, 1970, marked the date of one of the most significant events in Greenville County's educational history. Schools were ordered by the federal courts to integrate with an 80:20 ratio of whites to blacks (the statistical ratio of whites to blacks in the county.) To fulfill this order, 12,000 students in the school system had to be reassigned. Bryson High School was one of the schools affected. The tenth and eleventh graders from Bryson were assigned to Hillcrest High School. Ninth graders from Hillcrest High went to Bryson to complete the integration process. Bryson High became a ninth-grade center.

In the fall of 1973, Bryson High changed from a ninth-grade center into a middle school to serve students in grades six through eighth. In August 1993, Bryson Middle School relocated to its present location. The staff and students moved into a renovated building, the former Hillcrest High School.

Today Bryson Middle School is a regionally accredited public middle school serving grades six through eight. It is one of the largest of the eighteen middle schools in Greenville County (over 1000 students) and is adjacent to the county's largest school, Hillcrest High. This school serves the cities of Fountain Inn and Simpsonville.
