= Richard Bronson =

American professor (born 1941)

Richard D. Bronson
- Born: August 5, 1941 (age 85); New York City, United States
- Education: Stevens Institute of Technology
- Occupations: Educator, mathematician, author
- Writing career
- Genres: Thriller, non-fiction, poetry
- Website: www.antispinthebook.com

Richard D. Bronson (born August 5, 1941) is an American professor emeritus of mathematics at Fairleigh Dickinson University where he served as chair of the Department of Mathematics and Computer Science, acting dean of the College of Science and Engineering, interim provost of the Metropolitan Campus, director of government affairs, and senior executive assistant to the president. He served as an officer (2008–2011) of the International Association of University Presidents, where he was actively involved in the creation of the United Nations Academic Impact initiative and the World Innovative Summit in Education, held annually in Qatar. He is also the author of the political thriller Antispin.

== Personal life ==
Richard D. Bronson was born in New York City on August 5, 1941. He attended Stevens Institute of Technology, where he earned his B.S., M.S., and Ph.D. in applied mathematics. He is married and has two children.

== Writing ==
Bronson has written eleven books in mathematics, some in their third edition with many translated into multiple languages. He has published children's poetry in magazines, including Highlights for Children. He was on the editorial staff of Simulation Magazine and SIAM News and the children's magazine Kids Club. Antispin is his first novel.

== Awards ==
In 1994, Richard Bronson was awarded the Distinguished College or University Teaching award by the New Jersey Section of Mathematical Association of America. He also received the Fairleigh Dickinson University Distinguished Faculty Award for Research & Scholarship, and the University College Outstanding Teacher Award.

== Research ==
Bronson's research interests are in mathematical modeling and computer simulation with a focus on macro-sociological theory. He has written extensively on the topic in articles for professional journals and a general-interest trade magazine.

== Publications and presentations ==
=== Fiction ===
- Antispin (e-book, published 2010; ISBN 978-1-4537-7589-9)

=== Non-fiction: books ===
- Matrix Methods: An Introduction 3rd edition with Gabriel Costa (in production), Academic Press, New York. Second edition, 1991 (still in print). First edition 1970–1991.
- Linear Algebra: An Introduction 2nd edition with Gabriel Costa, Academic Press, New York, 2007. First edition, 1995–2007.
- Differential Equations 3rd edition with Gabriel Costa, Schaum's Outline Series, McGraw–Hill Book Company, New York, 2006. Second edition, 1993–2006; first edition under the title Modern Introductory Differential Equations, 1974–1993.
- Differential Equations, Schaum's Easy Outlines, McGraw–Hill Book Company, New York, 2003.
- Operations Research 2nd edition, with G. Naadimuthu, Schaum's Outline Series, McGraw–Hill Book Company, New York, 1997. First edition, 1982–1997.
- Matrix Operations, Schaum's Outline Series, McGraw–Hill Book Company, New York, 1989 (still in print).
- Finite Mathematics with Calculus, with Gary Bronson, Brooks/Cole Publishing Co., CA, 2000–2003 (out of print).
- Finite Mathematics, with Gary Bronson, West Publishing Co., St. Paul, MN, 1996–2003 (out of print).
- 2500 Solved Problems in Differential Equations, Schaum Division, McGraw–Hill Book Company, New York, 1989–1997 (out of print).
- Simulating Violators, monograph with Chanoch Jacobsen, Topics in Operations Research Series, Military Applications Section of Informs, Hanover, MD, 1985 (out of print).
- Mathematics for Management, with Gary Bronson, IEP Publishers, a subsidiary of Harper & Row, New York, 1977–87 (out of print).
