= Bronson (name) =

Bronson is both a surname and a masculine given name. Notable people with the name include:

== Surname ==
- Alvin Bronson (1783–1881), American businessman and politician
- Ben Bronson (born 1972), American football player
- Betty Bronson (1906–1971), American television and film actress
- Bryan Bronson (born 1972), American hurdler
- Charles Bronson (né Charles Dennis Buchinsky, 1921–2003), American actor
- Charles Bronson (prisoner) (born 1952 as Michael Gordon Peterson), British convicted prisoner
- Deming Bronson (1894–1957), American army officer
- Greene C. Bronson (1789–1863), American politician
- Hugh Bronson (born 1961), German politician
- Isaac H. Bronson (1802–1855), United States representative from New York
- Josiah Bronson (born 1997), American football player
- Lillian Bronson (1902–1995), American actress
- Po Bronson (born 1964), American author
- Richard Bronson (born 1941), American mathematician
- Richard "Skip" Bronson (fl. 1980s–2010s), American real estate developer
- Ruth Muskrat Bronson (née Ruth Margaret Muskrat, 1897–1982), American Cherokee poet and activist
- Stan Bronson Jr. (1928–2018), American batboy for the University of Memphis

== Given name ==
- Bronson Alcott (1799–1888), American teacher and writer, father of Louisa May Alcott
- Bronson Arroyo (born 1977), major league pitcher, member of the 2004 Boston Red Sox world series team
- Bronson Beri (born 1989), New Zealand basketball player
- Bronson Burgoon (born 1987), American professional golfer
- Bronson Chama (born 1986), Zambian professional footballer
- Bronson Crothers (1884–1959), American pediatric neurologist and professor
- Bronson M. Cutting (1888–1935), United States senator from New Mexico
- Bronson Garlick (born 1995), Australian professional rugby league footballer
- Bronson Gengezha (born 1981), Zimbabwean sculptor
- Bronson Harrison (born 1985), New Zealand professional rugby league footballer
- Bronson Heflin (born 1971), American professional baseball pitcher
- Bronson Hill (born 1993), American football running back
- Bronson Howard (1842–1908), American dramatist
- Bronson James (fl. 1990s–2020s), justice of the Oregon Supreme Court
- Bronson Kaufusi (born 1991), American football tight end
- Bronson Koenig (born 1994), American basketball player
- Bronson La Follette (1936–2018), American politician and lawyer
- Bronson La'Cassie (born 1983), Australian professional golfer
- Bronson Murray (born 1982), New Zealand rugby union player
- Bronson Pelletier (born 1986), Canadian actor
- Bronson Pinchot (born 1959), American actor
- Bronson Price (fl. 2010s–2020s), New Zealand MC, rapper and urban poet
- Bronson Ray (1868–1934), Southern Baptist minister
- Bronson Rechsteiner (born 1997), American professional wrestler performing as Bron Breakker
- Bronson Reed (born 1988), Australian professional wrestler
- Bronson Sardinha (born 1983), major league outfielder
- Bronson Cushing Skinner (1889–1981), American concentrated orange juice pioneer
- Bronson Tauakipulu (born 1996), Samoan rugby union player
- Marko Vukcevich (fl. 1990s–2000s), also known as Bronson, an ex-member of the band Mushroomhead
- Bronson Webb (born 1983), British actor
- Bronson Winthrop (1863–1944), American philanthropist and lawyer
- Bronson Xerri (born 2000), Australian professional rugby league footballer
- Buronson (or Bronson; born 1947), a Japanese comics writer

== Fictional characters ==
- Bronson, a fictional character in Mother 3
- Bronson Twist, a fictional character in Round the Twist
- Martha Bronson, a fictional recurring character in the American television sitcom Leave It to Beaver.
- Tom Bronson, a fictional character in DC Comics.
