= John Poupore =

Canadian politician

Member of the Canadian Parliament for Pontiac
- In office 1882–1891
- Preceded by: William McKay Wright
- Succeeded by: John Bryson

Member of the Legislative Assembly of Quebec for Pontiac
- In office 1867–1874
- Succeeded by: Levi Ruggles Church

Personal details
- Born: April 10, 1817 Edwardsburg, Upper Canada
- Died: July 12, 1896 (aged 79) Chichester, Quebec
- Party: Conservative

John Poupore (April 10, 1817 – July 12, 1896) was a Quebec lumber merchant and political figure. He was a Conservative Member of Parliament representing Pontiac from 1878 to 1882. He also represented Pontiac in the Legislative Assembly of the Province of Canada and the Legislative Assembly of Quebec from 1861 to 1874.

He was born in Edwardsburgh (Cardinal) in Upper Canada in 1817 and studied at Potsdam, New York. He later settled at Chichester, where his father became the first mayor. He established his own farm and operated a sawmill in the area. He also served as lieutenant-colonel in the Pontiac county militia. In 1861, he defeated Edmund Heath to become the representative for Pontiac County in the legislative assembly; he was reelected in 1863. He represented the county in the provincial legislative assembly from 1867 until he resigned in 1874. He also served as mayor of Chichester from 1866 to 1867. He was an immigration agent at Quebec City from 1876 to 1878, when he was elected to the House of Commons.

He died at Chichester in 1896 and was buried in Edwardsburgh.

His nephew and son-in-law, William Joseph Poupore, also represented Pontiac provincially and federally.

1878 Canadian federal election: Pontiac
Party	Candidate	Votes	%
Conservative	John Poupore	1,381	54.05
Unknown	Thomas Murray	1,174	45.95
Total valid votes		2,555	100.00
