= Edward Lawn =

Canadian politician

Edward Charles Lawn
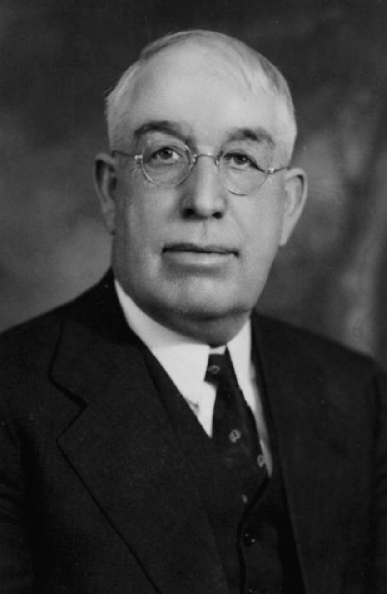

Member of the Legislative Assembly of Quebec for Pontiac
- In office 1935–1948
- Preceded by: Wallace McDonald
- Succeeded by: Raymond Thomas Johnston

Personal details
- Born: July 18, 1879; L'Île-du-Grand-Calumet, Quebec
- Died: May 15, 1961 (aged 81); Campbell's Bay, Quebec

Edward Charles Lawn (July 18, 1879 – May 15, 1961) was a Canadian merchant and politician in Quebec. He represented Pontiac in the Legislative Assembly of Quebec from 1935 to 1948 as a Liberal.

The son of John Lawn, farmer, and Jane Kenshaly, he was born in L'Île-du-Grand-Calumet and was educated in Bryson, in L'Île-du-Grand-Calumet and at business college in Ottawa. Lawn was a general merchant and lumber merchant in Campbell's Bay. He was a school trustee for 35 years and served as mayor of Campbell's Bay from 1920 to 1946. He served as prefect for Pontiac County from 1926 to 1928.

He was elected in 1935 and reelected in 1936, 1939 and 1944. He served as party whip from 1940 to 1945. Lawn was defeated by Raymond Thomas Johnston when he ran for reelection in 1948.

Lawn married Maggie Shannon in 1906.

He died in Campbell's Bay at the age of 81.
