= Otter Lake, Quebec =

Otter Lake
- Municipality
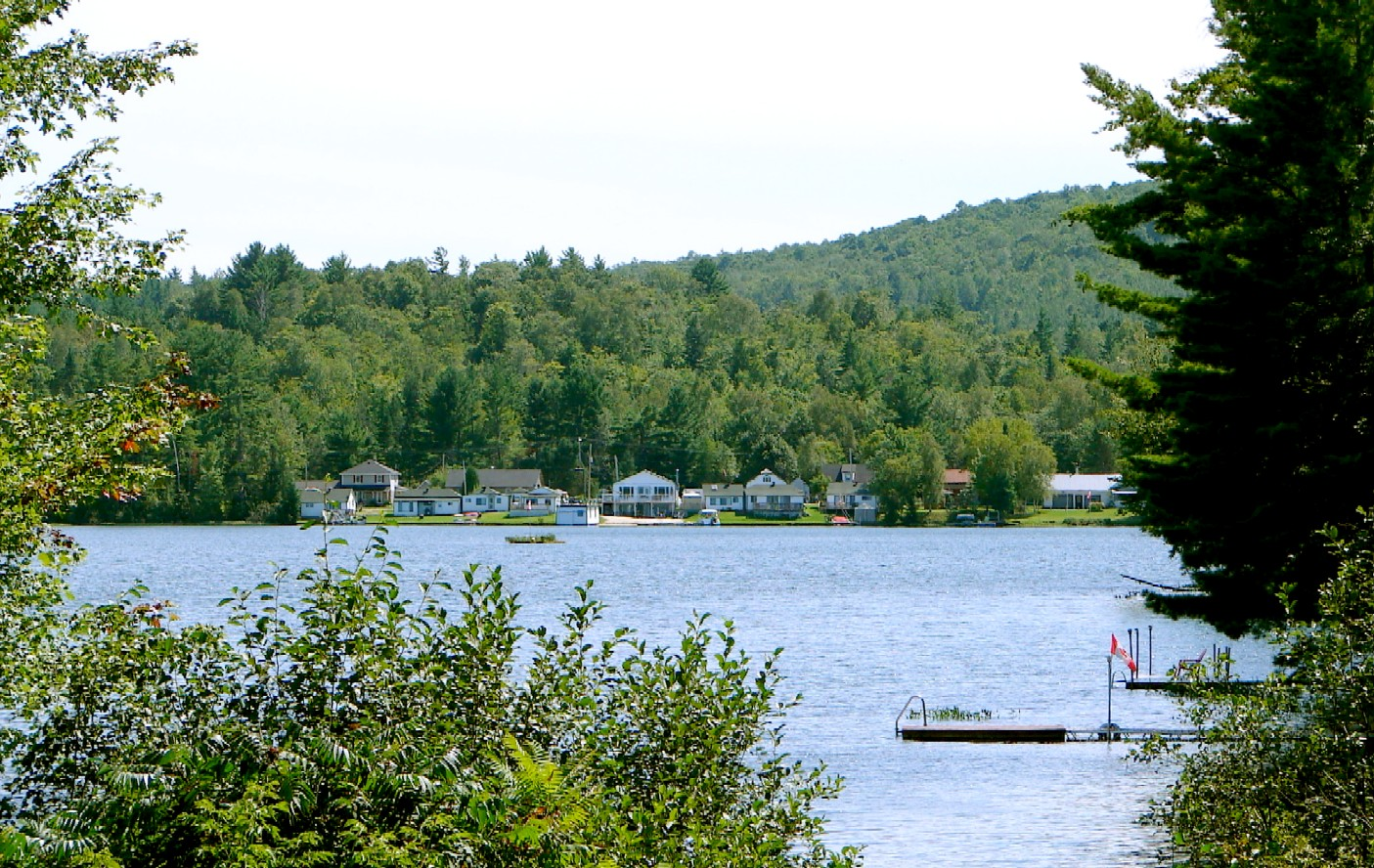

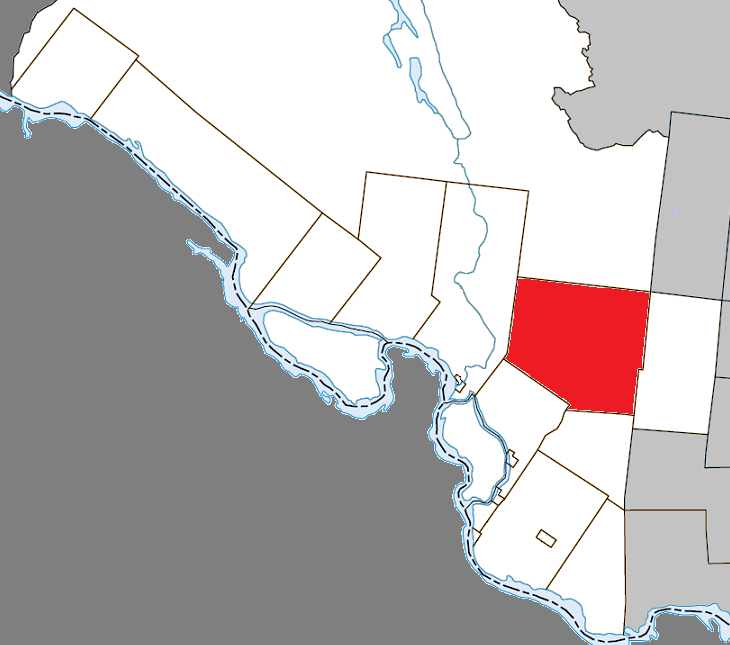
- Location within Pontiac RCM

- Location in western Quebec
- Coordinates: 45°51′N 76°26′W
- Country: Canada
- Province: Quebec
- Region: Outaouais
- RCM: Pontiac
- Constituted: January 1, 1877

Government
  - Mayor: Terry Lafleur
  - Federal riding: Pontiac—Kitigan Zibi
  - Prov. riding: Pontiac

Area
  - Total: 493.32 km^{2} (190.47 sq mi)
  - Land: 454.70 km^{2} (175.56 sq mi)

Population (2021)
  - Total: 1,041
  - Density: 2.3/km^{2} (6.0/sq mi)
  - Pop (2016–21): ▲11.7%
  - Dwellings: 1,134
- Time zone: UTC−5 (EST)
  - Summer (DST): UTC−4 (EDT)
- Postal code(s): J0X 2P0
- Area code: 819
- Access Routes: R-301; R-303
- Website: www.otterlakequebec.ca

Otter Lake is a municipality in the Outaouais region, northwest of Gatineau, part of the Pontiac Regional County Municipality, Quebec, Canada.

Prior to December 20, 2003 it was known as Leslie-Clapham-et-Huddersfield and had the legal status of a united township municipality.

== Geography ==
Population centres within the municipality include: Klukeville, Lauréat, Omer, Otter Lake, and Sandy Creek.

The village of Otter Lake is surrounded by Hughes Lake to the west, Lac de la Ferme (Farm Lake) to the east, McCuaig Lake to the south, and Lac à la Loutre (Otter Lake) to the north.

== History ==
In 1793, Huddersfield Township was established, named after its namesake in West Yorkshire, England. In 1866, Leslie Township was established, named after James Leslie (1786-1873), a Canadian senator.

Also in 1866, the Otter Lake post office opened and the village that formed around the post office also came to have the same name. Since then, Philemon Wright, pioneer of the logging industry in Ottawa, operated a wood depot at Otter Lake. The industry has played and continues to play a leading role in the early and contemporary history of the village.

In 1877, the United Township Municipality of Leslie-Clapham-et-Huddersfield was formed from its constituent townships. While Clapham Township was not officially established until 1920, it was already planned in the second half of the 19th century and named after a village north of Bedford, England. The united municipality was established because it was more advantageous to hold a municipal status than remain unorganized territory.

In 2004 the United Township Municipality of Leslie-Clapham-et-Huddersfield became the Municipality of Otter Lake.

== Demographics ==
=== Population ===
Canada census – Otter Lake community profile

	2021	2016	2011
Population	1,041 (+11.7% from 2016)	932 (-16.0% from 2011)	1,109 (+14.1% from 2006)
Land area	454.70 km^{2} (175.56 sq mi)	463.01 km^{2} (178.77 sq mi)	463.50 km^{2} (178.96 sq mi)
Population density	2.3/km^{2} (6.0/sq mi)	2.0/km^{2} (5.2/sq mi)	2.4/km^{2} (6.2/sq mi)
Median age	56 (M: 56, F: 55.6)	53.0 (M: 53.1, F: 52.8)	50.4 (M: 51.2, F: 49.9)
Private dwellings	1,134 (total)	1,068 (total)	1,130 (total)
Median household income	$49,600	$42,581	$.N/A

Notes: 2011 income data for this area has been suppressed for data quality or confidentiality reasons.
References: 2021 2016 2011

Historical Census Data - Otter Lake, Quebec

Year	Pop.	±%
1976	959	—
1981	962	+0.3%
1986	947	−1.6%
1991	923	−2.5%
1996	1,002	+8.6%

Year	Pop.	±%
2001	877	−12.5%
2006	972	+10.8%
2011	1,109	+14.1%
2016	932	−16.0%
2021	1,041	+11.7%

Source: Statistics Canada

=== Language ===
Canada Census Mother Tongue - Otter Lake, Quebec
Census	Total	French			English			French & English			Other		
Year	Responses	Count	Trend	Pop %	Count	Trend	Pop %	Count	Trend	Pop %	Count	Trend	Pop %
2021	1,040	400	▲19.4%	38.5%	580	▲0.9%	55.8%	45	▲200.0%	4.3%	15	▲200.0%	1.4%
2016	930	335	▼9.5%	36.0%	575	▼17.3%	61.8%	15	▼40.0%	1.6%	5	▼66.7%	0.5%
2011	1110	370	▼24.5%	33.3%	695	▲46.3%	62.6%	25	▲ n/a%	2.3%	15	▲ n/a%	1.4%
2006	970	490	▲92.2%	50.5%	475	▼20.2%	49.0%	0	▼100.0%	0.0%	0	▼100.0%	0.0%
2001	880	255	▼45.2%	29.0%	595	▲20.2%	67.6%	15	▲50.0%	1.7%	15	▲50.0%	1.7%
1996	985	465	n/a	47.2%	495	n/a	50.3%	10	n/a	1.0%	10	n/a	1.0%

== Local government ==
Otter Lake federal election results
Year	Liberal		Conservative		Bloc Québécois		New Democratic		Green	
2021	37%	205	38%	208	5%	29	9%	47	1%	6
2019	47%	228	33%	161	5%	22	9%	44	3%	12

Otter Lake provincial election results
Year	CAQ		Liberal		QC solidaire		Parti Québécois	
2018	18%	55	70%	211	1%	2	0%	1
2014	3%	16	93%	469	1%	6	2%	12

Otter Lake forms part of the federal electoral district of Pontiac—Kitigan Zibi and has been represented by Sophie Chatel of the Liberal Party since 2021. Provincially, Otter Lake is part of the Pontiac electoral district and is represented by André Fortin of the Quebec Liberal Party since 2014.

List of former mayors:

- Terry G. Richard (2001–2009)
- Graham Hawley (2009–2015)
- Kim Cartier-Villeneuve (2015–2021)
- Terry Lafleur (2021-)

== See also ==
- List of anglophone communities in Quebec
- List of municipalities in Quebec
