= Pontiac (provincial electoral district) =

Provincial electoral district in Quebec, Canada

Coordinates: 45.8°N 76.4°W

Quebec electoral district

Provincial electoral district
- Legislature: National Assembly of Quebec
MNA
André Fortin
Liberal
- District created: 1867
- District abolished: 1972
- District re-created: 1980
- First contested: 1867, 1981
- Last contested: 1970, 2026

Demographics
- Population (2006): 61,595
- Electors (2012): 48,370
- Area (km²): 14,683.8
- Pop. density (per km²): 4.2
- Census division(s): Gatineau (part), Les Collines-de-l'Outaouais (part), Pontiac
- Census subdivision(s): Gatineau (part), Alleyn-et-Cawood, Bristol, Bryson, Campbell's Bay, Chichester, Clarendon, Fort-Coulonge, L'Île-du-Grand-Calumet, L'Isle-aux-Allumettes, Litchfield, Mansfield-et-Pontefract, Otter Lake, Pontiac, Portage-du-Fort, Rapides-des-Joachims, Shawville, Sheenboro, Thorne, Waltham; Lac-Nilgaut

Pontiac is a provincial electoral district in the Outaouais region of Quebec, Canada, that elects members to the National Assembly of Quebec. It notably includes parts of the city of Gatineau as well as the municipalities of Pontiac, Mansfield-et-Pontefract, Shawville, and Clarendon.

It was created for the 1867 election (and an electoral district of that name existed earlier in the Legislative Assembly of the Province of Canada). Its final election was in 1970. It disappeared in the 1973 election and its successor electoral district was Pontiac-Témiscamingue.

However, Pontiac–Témiscamingue disappeared in the 1981 election and its successor electoral district was the re-created Pontiac.

It was named after Chief Pontiac, who led Pontiac's Rebellion in 1763 in the Great Lakes region.

== Members of the Legislative Assembly of the Province of Canada ==
This riding has elected the following members to the Legislative Assembly of the Province of Canada:

- John Egan, (1854–1857)
- George Bryson, Conservative (1857–1858) by-election
- Edmund Heath, Conservative (1858–1861)
- John Poupore, Conservative (1861–1867)

== Members of the Legislative Assembly/National Assembly of Quebec ==
This riding has elected the following members to the Legislative Assembly of Quebec (1867–1968) and the National Assembly of Quebec (1968–present):

Legislature	Years	Member	Party
1st	1867–1871	John Poupore	Conservative
2nd	1871–1874	John Poupore	Conservative
2nd	1874–1875	Levi Ruggles Church	Conservative
3rd	1875–1878	Levi Ruggles Church	Conservative
4th	1878–1881	Levi Ruggles Church	Conservative
5th	1881–1882†	Thomas Bryson	Conservative
5th	1883–1886	William Joseph Poupore	Conservative
6th	1886–1890	William Joseph Poupore	Conservative
7th	1890–1892	William Joseph Poupore	Conservative
8th	1892–1897	David Gillies	Liberal
9th	1897–1900	David Gillies	Liberal
10th	1900–1904	David Gillies	Liberal
11th	1904–1908	David Gillies	Liberal
12th	1908–1912	Tancrède-Charles Gaboury	Liberal
13th	1912–1916	George Benjamin Campbell	Conservative
14th	1916–1919	William Hodgins	Liberal
15th	1919–1923	Wallace McDonald	Liberal
16th	1923–1927	Wallace McDonald	Liberal
17th	1927–1931	Wallace McDonald	Liberal
18th	1931–1935	Wallace McDonald	Liberal
19th	1935–1936	Edward Charles Lawn	Liberal
20th	1936–1939	Edward Charles Lawn	Liberal
21st	1939–1944	Edward Charles Lawn	Liberal
22nd	1944–1948	Edward Charles Lawn	Liberal
23rd	1948–1952	Raymond Thomas Johnston	Union Nationale
24th	1952–1956	Raymond Thomas Johnston	Union Nationale
25th	1956–1960	Raymond Thomas Johnston	Union Nationale
26th	1960–1962	Raymond Thomas Johnston	Union Nationale
27th	1962–1966	Raymond Thomas Johnston	Union Nationale
28th	1966–1970	Raymond Thomas Johnston	Union Nationale
29th	1970–1973	Jean-Guy Larivière	Liberal
Riding dissolved into Pontiac-Témiscamingue
Riding re-created from Pontiac-Témiscamingue
32nd	1981–1985	Robert Middlemiss	Liberal
33rd	1985–1989	Robert Middlemiss	Liberal
34th	1989–1994	Robert Middlemiss	Liberal
35th	1994–1998	Robert Middlemiss	Liberal
36th	1998–2003	Robert Middlemiss	Liberal
37th	2003–2007	Charlotte L'Écuyer	Liberal
38th	2007–2008	Charlotte L'Écuyer	Liberal
39th	2008–2012	Charlotte L'Écuyer	Liberal
40th	2012–2014	Charlotte L'Écuyer	Liberal
41st	2014–2018	André Fortin	Liberal
42nd	2018–2022	André Fortin	Liberal
43rd	2022–2026	André Fortin	Liberal
44th	2026–Present	André Fortin	Liberal

== Election results ==
2026 Quebec general election
** Preliminary results — Not yet official **
Party	Candidate	Votes	%	±%
Liberal	André Fortin	18,358	61.36	
Conservative	Osmar Llanos Martinez	3,373	11.27	
Parti Québécois	Marcela Cazas	3,236	10.82	
Québec solidaire	Bianca Baldo	2,862	9.57	
Coalition Avenir Québec	Mariana Mefleh	1,686	5.64	
Canadian	William Twolan	402	1.34	
Total valid votes				
Total rejected ballots				
Turnout			53.51	
Electors on the lists			–	–
Liberal hold		Swing		
Source: Élections Québec

2022 Quebec general election
Party	Candidate	Votes	%	±%
Liberal	André Fortin	12,477	43.68	-10.21
Coalition Avenir Québec	Corinne Canuel-Jolicoeur	7,056	24.70	+4.29
Conservative	Terrence Watters	3,118	10.92	+7.83
Québec solidaire	Mike Owen Sebagenzi	2,935	10.28	-0.46
Parti Québécois	Jolaine Paradis-Châteauneuf	1,887	6.61	+1.10
Green	Pierre Cyr	616	2.16	-1.17
Canadian	William Twolan	475	1.66	–
Total valid votes		28,564	99.36	–
Total rejected ballots		185	0.64	–
Turnout		28,749	53.50	-0.03
Electors on the lists		53,735		

2018 Quebec general election
Party	Candidate	Votes	%	±%
Liberal	André Fortin	14,869	53.89	-21.87
Coalition Avenir Québec	Olive Kamanyana	5,632	20.41	+11.48
Québec solidaire	Julia Wilkie	2,964	10.74	+4.37
Parti Québécois	Marie-Claire Nivolon	1,520	5.51	-3.04
Green	Roger Fleury	919	3.33	
Conservative	Kenny Roy	853	3.09	
New Democratic	Samuel Gendron	795	2.88	
Marxist–Leninist	Louis Lang	40	0.14	-0.25
Total valid votes		27,592	99.11	
Total rejected ballots		249	0.89	
Turnout		27,841	53.53	
Eligible voters		52,009		
Liberal hold		Swing		-16.675
Source(s) "Rapport des résultats officiels du scrutin". Élections Québec.

2014 Quebec general election
Party	Candidate	Votes	%	±%
Liberal	André Fortin	25,659	75.76	+19.13
Coalition Avenir Québec	Michel Mongeon	3,026	8.93	-9.13
Parti Québécois	Maryse Vallières-Murray	2,897	8,55	-7.57
Québec solidaire	Charmain Levy	2,157	6,37	+1.15
Marxist–Leninist	Louis Lang	131	0.39	+0.19

2012 Quebec general election
Party	Candidate	Votes	%	±%
Liberal	Charlotte L'Écuyer	16,981	56.63	-9.47
Coalition Avenir Québec	André LaFramboise	5,417	18.06	+11.81*
Parti Québécois	Geneviève Gendron-Nadeau	4 835	16,12	-1.99
Québec solidaire	Charmain Levy	1 565	5,22	+1.09
Green	Garry Bélair	906	3,02	-1.77
Option nationale	Patrick Émard	223	0.74	-
Marxist–Leninist	Louis Lang	61	0.20	-0.43

* Increase is from Action Democratique du Quebec (ADQ)

2008 Quebec general election
Party	Candidate	Votes	%	±%
Liberal	Charlotte L'Écuyer	12,960	66.10	+7.56
Parti Québécois	Nathalie Lepage	3,551	18.11	+5.24
Action démocratique	Christian Toussaint	1,225	6.25	-9.33
Green	Gail Lemmon Walker	940	4.79	-5.08
Québec solidaire	Charmain Levy	809	4.13	+1.25
Marxist–Leninist	Lisa Leblanc	123	0.63	+0.37

2007 Quebec general election
Party	Candidate	Votes	%	±%
Liberal	Charlotte L'Écuyer	14,817	58.54	-17.98
Action démocratique	Victor Bilodeau	3,943	15.58	+7.75
Parti Québécois	Patrick Robert-Meunier	3,257	12.87	-0.53
Green	Brian Gibb	2,498	9.87	-
Québec solidaire	Jessica Squires	729	2.88	+1.20*
Marxist–Leninist	David Ethier-April	66	0.26	-0.30

* Increase is from UFP

2003 Quebec general election
Party	Candidate	Votes	%	±%
Liberal	Charlotte L'Écuyer	17,885	76.52	+1.25
Parti Québécois	Luc Côté	3,133	13.40	-0.73
Action démocratique	Victor Bilodeau	1,830	7.83	+4.55
UFP	Serge Tanguay	392	1.68	-
Marxist–Leninist	Louis Lang	132	0.56	+0.32

1998 Quebec general election
Party	Candidate	Votes	%	±%
Liberal	Robert Middlemiss	22,076	75.27	-4.91
Parti Québécois	L.-Hubert Leduc	4,143	14.13	-0.41
Equality	Denzil Spence	1,757	5.99	+2.55
Action démocratique	Christian Bilodeau	963	3.28	-
Independent	Maxime Gauld	112	0.38	-
Socialist Democracy	Mohamed-Ali Khreis	108	0.37	-
Natural Law	Claude Côté	100	0.34	-0.12
Marxist–Leninist	Alexandre Legeais	69	0.24	+0.05

1995 Quebec referendum
Side	Votes	%
Non	30,632	87.23
Oui	4,485	12.77

1994 Quebec general election
Party	Candidate	Votes	%	±%
Liberal	Robert Middlemiss	23,066	80.18	+33.62
Parti Québécois	Françoise Trudeau-Reeves	4,183	14.54	-3.2
Equality	Robert D. Matheson	990	3.44	-27.19
Lemon	Diane Labrie	342	1.19	-
Natural Law	Michael E. Wilson	131	0.46	-
Marxist–Leninist	Louis Lang	55	0.19	-0.21

1992 Charlottetown Accord referendum
Side	Votes	%
Oui	21,044	74.45
Non	7,222	25.55

1989 Quebec general election
Party	Candidate	Votes	%	±%
Liberal	Robert Middlemiss	9,514	46.56	-25.52
Unity	Mark Alexander	6,259	30.63	-
Parti Québécois	Jules Fournier	3,624	17.74	-1.07
New Democrat	Michael Coghlan	956	4.68	+0.03
Marxist–Leninist	Louis Lang	81	0.40	-

1985 Quebec general election
Party	Candidate	Votes	%	±%
Liberal	Robert Middlemiss	13,888	72.08	+4.25
Parti Québécois	Normand Auclair	3,623	18.81	-2.19
New Democrat	Michel Martin	896	4.65	-
Progressive Conservative	Anne Lupien	783	4.06	-
Christian Socialist	Anne Charron	77	0.40	-

1981 Quebec general election
Party	Candidate	Votes	%	±%
Liberal	Robert Middlemiss	15,157	67.83	+24.26
Parti Québécois	William Bedwell	4,691	21.00	+3.95
Freedom of Choice	Stephen Hodgins	1,793	8.02	-
Union Nationale	Lucille Hodgins	704	3.15	-21.27

== See also ==
- List of Quebec provincial electoral districts
- Canadian provincial electoral districts
