= Wallace McDonald =

Canadian politician

Member of Legislative Assembly of Quebec for Pontiac
- In office 1919 – September 1935
- Preceded by: William Hodgins
- Succeeded by: Edward Charles Lawn

Member of Parliament for Pontiac
- In office October 1935 – May 1946
- Preceded by: Charles Bélec
- Succeeded by: Réal Caouette

Personal details
- Born: Wallace Reginald McDonald; 18 July 1876 Portage-du-Fort, Quebec
- Died: 2 May 1946 (aged 69) Chapeau, Quebec
- Party: Liberal
- Spouse(s): Cora Desjardins m. 25 September 1909
- Profession: Merchant

Wallace Reginald McDonald (18 July 1876 – 2 May 1946) was a Liberal party member of the House of Commons of Canada. He was born in Portage-du-Fort, Quebec and became a merchant by career.

McDonald attended the University of Ottawa. He became mayor of Chapeau, Quebec from 1915 to 1923 and served as warden of Pontiac County from 1918 to 1921.

He was elected to the Legislative Assembly of Quebec for the Quebec Liberal Party in 1919 for the Pontiac electoral district then re-elected for successive terms in 1923, 1927, and 1931.

McDonald resigned his provincial seat on 25 September 1935 to seek national office for the federal Liberal party. He was elected to the House of Commons at the Pontiac riding in the 1935 general election then re-elected in 1940 and 1945.

After a year of ill health, McDonald died at his home in Chapeau on 2 May 1946 before completing his term in the 20th Canadian Parliament.

== Electoral record ==
1945 Canadian federal election: Pontiac
| Party | Candidate | Votes | % | ±% |
|---|---|---|---|---|
| Liberal | Wallace McDonald | 13,325 | 41.38 | -2.24 |
| Progressive Conservative | Thomas Edward McCool | 6,136 | 19.06 | |
| Social Credit | Réal Caouette | 5,852 | 18.17 | |
| Bloc populaire | Georges-Antoine Rioux | 4,433 | 13.77 | |
| Co-operative Commonwealth | Antoine E. Titley | 2,453 | 7.62 | |
| Total valid votes | | 32,199 | 100.00 | |

1940 Canadian federal election: Pontiac
| Party | Candidate | Votes | % | ±% |
|---|---|---|---|---|
| Liberal | Wallace McDonald | 13,206 | 43.62 | +12.36 |
| Independent Liberal | Joseph-Édouard Piché | 11,941 | 39.44 | |
| National Government | Ernest Carrier | 5,128 | 16.94 | |
| Total valid votes | | 30,275 | 100.00 | |

1935 Canadian federal election: Pontiac
| Party | Candidate | Votes | % | ±% |
|---|---|---|---|---|
| Liberal | Wallace McDonald | 5,708 | 31.26 | |
| Liberal | Joseph-Édouard Piché | 5,626 | 30.81 | |
| Conservative | Joseph-Aurèle Raymond | 4,409 | 24.14 | -16.68 |
| Reconstruction | Dieudonné Lapointe | 2,519 | 13.79 | |
| Total valid votes | | 18,262 | 100.00 | |
