= William Joseph Poupore =

Canadian politician

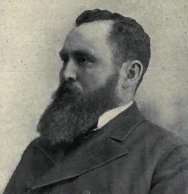

Member of the Canadian Parliament for Pontiac
- In office 1896–1900
- Preceded by: John Bryson
- Succeeded by: Thomas Murray

Member of the Legislative Assembly of Quebec for Pontiac
- In office 1882–1892
- Preceded by: Thomas Bryson
- Succeeded by: David Gillies

Personal details
- Born: April 29, 1846 Allumette Island, Canada East
- Died: August 17, 1918 (aged 72) Westmount, Quebec, Canada
- Party: Conservative
- Other political affiliations: Conservative Party of Quebec

William Joseph Poupore (April 29, 1846 – August 17, 1918) was a Canadian politician.

Born in Allumette Island, Canada East, the son of William Poupore and Susan McAdams, Poupore was educated on Allumette Island and at Ottawa College where he studied law for two years. He was a mill owner, contractor, and lumberer. In 1870, Poupore married his first cousin Eleonor, the daughter of John Poupore. He was mayor of Chichester from 1872 to 1882 and was warden of the county of Pontiac from 1881 to 1882. He was elected to the Legislative Assembly of Quebec for the electoral district of Pontiac in a by-election held in 1882. A Quebec Conservative, he was re-elected in 1886 and in 1890 by acclamation. He was defeated in 1892. He was elected to the House of Commons of Canada for the electoral district of Pontiac in the 1896 federal election. A Conservative, he did not run for reelection in 1900. Poupore died in Westmount at the age of 72 and was buried in the Notre Dame des Neiges Cemetery.

1896 Canadian federal election: Pontiac
Party	Candidate	Votes	%	±%
Conservative	W.J. Poupore	1,980	59.62	
Liberal	T.C. Gaboury	1,341	40.38	
Total valid votes		3,321	100.00	
