= George Frederick Hodgins =

Canadian politician

George Frederick Hodgins (1873 – 17 January 1940) was a merchant and political figure in Quebec. He represented Pontiac in the House of Commons of Canada from 1908 to 1911 as a Liberal.

He was born in Shawville, Canada East to James and Sarah Hodgins and was educated at the Shawville Academy. In 1890, he married Georgina Thomas. He was president of the Shawville Milling Company. He also served as chairman of the local school board. He ran unsuccessfully for a seat in the House of Commons in 1904. Hodgins was defeated by Gerald Hugh Brabazon when he ran for reelection in 1911. He died in Ottawa at the age of 74.

1911 Canadian federal election: Pontiac
| Party | Candidate | Votes | % | ±% |
|---|---|---|---|---|
| Conservative | Gerald Hugh Brabazon | 2,059 | 44.59 | +3.15 |
| Liberal | Frank S. Cahill | 1,393 | 30.16 | |
| Liberal | George Frederick Hodgins | 1,166 | 25.25 | -33.32 |
| Total valid votes | | 4,618 | 100.00 | |

1908 Canadian federal election: Pontiac
| Party | Candidate | Votes | % | ±% |
|---|---|---|---|---|
| Liberal | George Frederick Hodgins | 2,543 | 58.57 | +9.78 |
| Conservative | Gerald Hugh Brabazon | 1,799 | 41.43 | -9.78 |
| Total valid votes | | 4,342 | 100.00 | |
