= Mathieu Ravignat =

Canadian politician (born 1973)

Shadow Minister for the Treasury Board
- In office April 19, 2012 – November 19, 2015
- Leader: Thomas Mulcair
- Preceded by: Alexandre Boulerice
- Succeeded by: Pierre Poilievre

Member of the Canadian Parliament for Pontiac
- In office May 2, 2011 – October 19, 2015
- Preceded by: Lawrence Cannon
- Succeeded by: Will Amos

Personal details
- Born: January 18, 1973 (age 53) Orleans, Ontario
- Party: New Democrat
- Children: 2
- Profession: Policy researcher, leisure time Karate instructor,

Mathieu Gérard Ravignat (born January 18, 1973) is a Canadian federal politician from Cantley, Quebec, Canada, who was elected to the House of Commons of Canada from the riding of Pontiac in the May 2, 2011 federal election. He is a member of the New Democratic Party, which formed the official opposition in the 41st Canadian Parliament. He was defeated by Liberal Will Amos in the 2015 Canadian federal election.

== Early life ==
Of Belgian descent and raised in Gracefield, Quebec and Orleans, Ontario, Ravignat received a master's degree in political science. He co-founded Local 2626 of the Canadian Union of Public Employees, the labour union that represents student employees of the University of Ottawa. He was also the father to two daughters as of 2011. At the time of his election to Parliament, Ravignat was a federal government researcher for aboriginal and environmental issues.

== Political career ==
Ravignat first ran for a seat as an independent candidate in the 1997 federal election. Ravignat ran in the riding of Laurier—Sainte-Marie finishing in last place out of eight candidates earning 123 votes. He was soundly defeated by Bloc Québécois leader Gilles Duceppe.

Ravignat ran for his second time as a New Democratic Party candidate in the 2011 federal election. He was nominated by the party to contest the riding of Pontiac. On election night, he won his first term in office and picked up the seat for his party by defeating Conservative Foreign Affairs Minister Lawrence Cannon, despite the Conservative Party gaining its first majority government in the election. He was defeated by Liberal Will Amos in the 2015 Canadian federal election.

== After politics ==
Ravignat is a sensei at the Daijiken Traditional Karate Association which he founded in Wakefield, Quebec. He is also one of the founders of the Canada Hokubei Karate-jutsu and Kobu-jutsu Association, a national martial arts organization affiliated with the North America Karate-jutsu Kobu-jutsu Association and with the International Kenshi-kai Organisation (IKO) headquartered in Okinawa, Japan.

== Honours ==
=== Medals ===
Ribbon	Description	Notes	Ref
	Sovereign's Medal for Volunteers	Awarded 4 December 2017	
	Queen Elizabeth II Diamond Jubilee Medal for Canada	Awarded in 2012	

=== Arms ===
Coat of arms of Mathieu Ravignat
Adopted Shield of arms & badge granted by the Canadian Heraldic Authority on 15 March 2011, crest/full achievement granted on 20 April 2012 by the same. Crest Issuant from a coronet of fleurs-de-lis and escallops Or a demi-lion guardant Sable holding in the dexter paw a rose Gules barbed and slipped Vert Escutcheon Paly Or and Sable a lion rampant Gules charged with a crescent Or Motto FORTITUDO IN AMORE ET PROELIO Badge A lion’s face Gules jessant-de-lis per pale Or and Sable within a belt Sable edged, buckled and inscribed with the Motto in letters Or

== Electoral record ==
2015 Canadian federal election: Pontiac
Party	Candidate	Votes	%	±%	Expenditures
Liberal	Will Amos	34,154	54.54	+39.35	$127,717.07
New Democratic	Mathieu Ravignat	14,095	22.51	-24.76	$47,758.81
Conservative	Benjamin Woodman	8,721	13.93	-12.26	$35,653.16
Bloc Québécois	Nicolas Lepage	4,327	6.91	-2.64	–
Green	Colin Griffiths	1,089	1.74	+0.11	$7,418.25
Strength in Democracy	Pascal Médieu	131	0.21	–	$379.41
Marxist–Leninist	Louis Lang	108	0.17	–	–
Total valid votes/expense limit		62,625	100.0		$254,590.45
Total rejected ballots		467	–	–	
Turnout		63,092	–	–	
Eligible voters		87,365			
Source: Elections Canada

2011 Canadian federal election: Pontiac
Party	Candidate	Votes	%	±%	Expenditures
New Democratic	Mathieu Ravignat	22,376	45.71	+30.28	
Conservative	Lawrence Cannon	14,441	29.50	-3.20	
Liberal	Cindy Duncan McMillan	6,242	12.75	-11.49	
Bloc Québécois	Maude Tremblay	4,917	10.05	-12.28	
Green	Louis-Philippe Mayrand	849	1.73	-3.28	
Marxist–Leninist	Benoit Legros	124	0.25	-0.01	
Total valid votes/expense limit		48,949	100.00		
Total rejected ballots		413	0.84	+0.13	
Turnout		49,362	60.00		
Eligible voters		82,308	–	–	
