= David Gillies =

Canadian politician

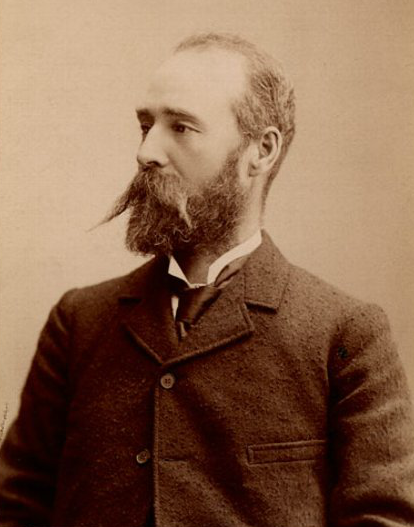

Member of the Legislative Assembly of Quebec for Pontiac
- In office 1892–1908
- Preceded by: William Joseph Poupore
- Succeeded by: Tancrède-Charles Gaboury

Personal details
- Born: June 27, 1849
- Died: October 12, 1926 (aged 77) Carleton Place, Ontario
- Party: Liberal

David Gillies (June 27, 1849 – October 12, 1926) was a lumber merchant in Ontario and political figure in Quebec. He represented Pontiac in the Legislative Assembly of Quebec from 1892 to 1908 as a Liberal.

== Life and career ==
Gillies was born in Herron's Mills in Lanark County, Canada West. He was the son of John Gillies and Mary Cullen Bain, both Scottish immigrants. He was educated in Lanark, Carleton Place and at the Brockville Business College. With his brothers, he established a lumber company at Braeside, Ontario on the Ottawa River in 1873, serving as president from 1914 to 1926. Gillies Bros. & Co. Ltd. also manufactured steam engines, mill machinery, textiles and boats. The company did much of their logging in the Pontiac region and Gillies was elected to the Quebec assembly four times even though he was a resident of Ontario.

In 1879, he married Martha Poole. He settled in Carleton Place in 1880. Gillies died in Carleton Place at the age of 77.

Gillies Bros. & Co. Ltd. continued to operate under family ownership until 1963, when it was purchased by Consolidated Paper Corporation who continued operating the company under the same name.
