= Will Amos =

Canadian politician and lawyer (born 1974)

Member of Parliament for Pontiac
- In office October 19, 2015 – September 20, 2021
- Preceded by: Mathieu Ravignat
- Succeeded by: Sophie Chatel

Personal details
- Born: William Amos; December 4, 1974 (age 51) Ottawa, Ontario, Canada
- Party: Liberal
- Spouse: Regina Amos
- Children: 2
- Education: McMaster University (BASc); University of British Columbia (MA); McGill University (JD, BCL)
- Profession: Lawyer; lecturer

William Amos (born December 4, 1974) is a Canadian politician and lawyer who served as Member of Parliament (MP) for the riding of Pontiac, Quebec from 2015 to 2021. A member of the Liberal Party, he was first elected in the 2015 federal election and was re-elected in the 2019 federal election. In December 2019, Amos was appointed parliamentary secretary to the Minister of Innovation, Science and Industry.

In May 2021, he temporarily stepped away from his role after two on-camera incidents during parliamentary sessions: one in which he was naked on a non-public video feed and a second in which he urinated into a coffee cup on camera during a non-public session. Amos described both incidents as accidental and apologized for them, while also calling for an investigation into how a photo of the first incident was leaked to the press. In June 2021, Amos's urination incident was ruled a prima facie case of contempt against the House of Commons by Speaker Anthony Rota, and the matter was referred to the chamber's Procedure and House Affairs Committee. In August 2021, he announced that he would not seek re-election in that year's election.

Before entering politics, Amos was a lawyer for Ecojustice Canada, a lecturer at the University of Ottawa Faculty of Law, and director of the uOttawa Ecojustice Environmental Law Clinic.

== Education and career ==
Amos attended McMaster University, earning a Bachelor of Arts and Science degree and a Master of Arts degree from the University of British Columbia. He went on to attend McGill University's civil/common law program, graduating in 2004. Amos was called to the bar in both Ontario and Quebec and worked for a large Montreal law firm. He advised former Cabinet minister David Anderson on issues related to species at risk and worked in the Prime Minister's Office under Jean Chrétien.

=== Ecojustice Canada and University of Ottawa ===
By 2007, Amos was a lawyer for Ecojustice Canada, an environmental law charity which had partnered with the University of Ottawa (uOttawa) Faculty of Law to create the uOttawa-Ecojustice Environmental Law Clinic, which provided legal advice to individuals and community groups involved in environmental law cases. During his time at the environmental law clinic, Amos collaborated as an author on four books, three of which were about the mining industry in Quebec, and one on holding the Canadian government accountable for environmental enforcement. Amos was a part-time lecturer and staff lawyer at the University of Ottawa before being promoted to director of the uOttawa-Ecojustice Environmental Law Clinic in August 2010.

== Political career ==
In October 2014, Amos won the Liberal nomination to run in Pontiac for the 2015 federal election. He won the riding in the 2015 election, unseating incumbent Mathieu Ravignat of the New Democratic Party (NDP). At the time of his election, Amos was teaching law at the University of Ottawa as the director of the uOttawa-Ecojustice Environmental Law Clinic.

Amos was re-elected following the 2019 election. On December 12, 2019, Amos was appointed parliamentary secretary to the Minister of Innovation, Science and Industry, with a focus on science. On August 8, 2021, Amos announced he would not seek re-election.

=== On-camera incidents ===
On April 14, 2021, Amos apologized for appearing naked during a hybrid parliamentary session with other members of parliament. He stated that he had just gone out for a jog and that his video was "accidentally turned on." In response to the incident, Bloc Québécois member Claude DeBellefeuille said that members should remember always to be fully clothed, and Anthony Rota, Speaker of the House of Commons, replied by saying that members should "always be vigilant when they are near a camera and a microphone."

The incident occurred on a video feed that only Members of Parliament and House of Commons staff can see, separate from the public-facing video system. It is against House of Commons rules to share video or images of non-public parliamentary proceedings. On April 15, Liberal House Leader Pablo Rodriguez called the leak of the photograph potentially "criminal" and an act of "callous disrespect". Rodriguez also called for an investigation into the leak of the photograph to be conducted by House Speaker Anthony Rota. Amos issued a statement on April 15, supporting the call for an investigation. Liberal Whip Mark Holland said that his counterparts from the NDP and Bloc reached out saying that the image had not originated from any of their offices. On April 21, 2021, Bloc MP Sébastien Lemire apologized for taking the image of Amos that had been spread online and said he was not sure how the image reached the media.

On May 27, 2021, Amos released a statement apologizing for urinating while on camera the day before, saying that while it was accidental and not visible to the public, it was still unacceptable. He also announced that he was temporarily stepping aside from his role as parliamentary secretary to Industry Minister Francois-Philippe Champagne and from his committee work to seek assistance. On June 7, 2021, Speaker Rota ruled that Amos's urinating incident was a prima facie case of contempt of the House of Commons, and said that the procedure and House Affairs committee should investigate further. A motion to refer the incident was then passed without objection. On June 8, Amos's office stated that Amos was receiving help with stress and time management.

In August 2021, Amos announced that he would not seek re-election in that year's election.

== Personal life ==
Amos currently resides in Chelsea with his wife and two children. He is fluently bilingual.

== Electoral record ==
2019 Canadian federal election: Pontiac
Party	Candidate	Votes	%	±%	Expenditures
Liberal	Will Amos	30,217	48.9	-5.64	$95,087.19
Conservative	Dave Blackburn	10,416	16.8	+2.87	$17,989.25
Bloc Québécois	Jonathan Carreiro-Benoit	9,929	16.1	+9.19	$2,059.60
New Democratic	Denise Giroux	6,503	10.5	-12.01	none listed
Green	Claude Bertrand	3,762	6.1	+4.36	none listed
People's	Mario Belec	775	1.3		$0.00
Veterans Coalition	Shawn Stewart	194	0.3		none listed
Marxist–Leninist	Louis Lang	51	0.1	-0.07	$0.00
Total valid votes/expense limit		61,847	100.0		
Total rejected ballots		661			
Turnout		62,508	68.2		
Eligible voters		91,656			
Liberal hold		Swing		-4.26	
Source: Elections Canada

2015 Canadian federal election: Pontiac
Party	Candidate	Votes	%	±%	Expenditures
Liberal	Will Amos	34,154	54.54	+39.35	$127,717.07
New Democratic	Mathieu Ravignat	14,095	22.51	-24.76	$47,758.81
Conservative	Benjamin Woodman	8,721	13.93	-12.26	$35,653.16
Bloc Québécois	Nicolas Lepage	4,327	6.91	-2.64	–
Green	Colin Griffiths	1,089	1.74	+0.11	$7,418.25
Strength in Democracy	Pascal Médieu	131	0.21	–	$379.41
Marxist–Leninist	Louis Lang	108	0.17	–	–
Total valid votes/expense limit		62,625	100.0		$254,590.45
Total rejected ballots		467	–	–	
Turnout		63,092	–	–	
Eligible voters		87,365			
Source: Elections Canada
