= Frank S. Cahill =

Canadian politician

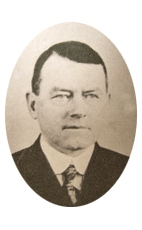

Member of the Canadian Parliament for Pontiac
- In office 1917–1930
- Preceded by: Gerald Hugh Brabazon
- Succeeded by: Charles Bélec

Personal details
- Born: January 27, 1876 Calumet Island, Quebec, Canada
- Died: April 17, 1934 (aged 58) Campbell's Bay, Quebec
- Party: Liberal Party (1911-1930), Laurier Liberals (1917-1921)
- Spouse: Mildred Coyne
- Occupation: broker, clerk, real estate broker

Frank S. Cahill (27 January 1876, in Calumet Island, Quebec – 17 April 1934), was a politician, broker, clerk and real estate broker.

The son of William Cahill, he was educated in Campbell's Bay, Quebec. Cahill worked as a postal clerk in Sault Ste. Marie, Michigan for several years, then moved to Saskatchewan, working as a real estate broker in Saskatoon. In 1909, he opened another real estate office in Ottawa. Cahill married Mildred Coyne in 1910.

He was elected to the House of Commons of Canada as a Member of the Liberal Party (Laurier Liberal) caucus in the 1917 election to represent the riding of Pontiac. He was re-elected in 1921, 1925 and 1926 then defeated in 1930.

== Electoral record ==
1930 Canadian federal election: Pontiac
Party	Candidate	Votes	%	±%
Conservative	Charles Bélec	8,884	40.82	+5.41
Independent Liberal	J.-Philippe Coté	6,988	32.11	
Liberal	Frank S. Cahill	5,891	27.07	-37.52
Total valid votes		21,763	100.00	

1926 Canadian federal election: Pontiac
Party	Candidate	Votes	%	±%
Liberal	Frank S. Cahill	11,166	64.59	+15.36
Conservative	Lucien-Alfred Ladouceur	6,121	35.41	+5.05
Total valid votes		17,287	100.0	

1925 Canadian federal election: Pontiac
Party	Candidate	Votes	%	±%
Liberal	Frank S. Cahill	7,562	49.23	-17.35
Conservative	Lucien Alfred Ladouceur	4,663	30.36	+7.52
Independent Liberal	Arthur Lepage	3,136	20.42	
Total valid votes		15,361	100.00	

1921 Canadian federal election: Pontiac
Party	Candidate	Votes	%	±%
Liberal	Frank S. Cahill	11,077	66.58	-10.92
Conservative	George Benjamin Campbell	3,800	22.84	+0.34
Progressive	George A. Landon	1,760	10.58	
Total valid votes		16,637	100.00	

Note: Conservative vote is compared to Government vote in 1917 election, and Liberal vote is compared to Opposition vote

1917 Canadian federal election: Pontiac
Party	Candidate	Votes	%	±%
Opposition (Laurier Liberals)	Frank S. Cahill	5,548	77.50	
Government (Unionist)	Joseph David Bastien	1,611	22.50	-22.08
Total valid votes		7,159	100.00	

1911 Canadian federal election: Pontiac
Party	Candidate	Votes	%	±%
Conservative	Gerald Hugh Brabazon	2,059	44.59	+3.15
Liberal	Frank S. Cahill	1,393	30.16	
Liberal	George Frederick Hodgins	1,166	25.25	-33.32
Total valid votes		4,618	100.00	
