= Charles Bélec =

Canadian politician (1872–1958)

Member of the Canadian Parliament for Pontiac
- In office 1930–1935
- Preceded by: Frank S. Cahill
- Succeeded by: Wallace McDonald

Personal details
- Born: 23 December 1872 Fort Coulonge, Quebec, Canada
- Died: 16 January 1958 (aged 85)
- Party: Conservative Party
- Occupation: farmer

Charles Bélec (23 December 1872 in Fort Coulonge, Quebec, Canada – 16 January 1958) was a Canadian politician and farmer. He was elected to the House of Commons of Canada in the 1930 election as a Member of the Conservative Party to represent the riding of Pontiac.

The son of Charles Bélec and Tarsille Gervais, he operated a farm near Fort Coulonge. Bélec was married twice: to a Miss Bertrand in 1894 and to Louise Gervais in 1904.

Prior to his federal political experience, he was twice elected mayor of Mansfield-et-Pontefract, Quebec, in 1902 and 1924 serving one year terms.

He ran unsuccessfully for a seat in the Quebec assembly in 1923.

1930 Canadian federal election: Pontiac
Party	Candidate	Votes	%	±%
Conservative	Charles Bélec	8,884	40.82	+5.41
Independent Liberal	J.-Philippe Coté	6,988	32.11	
Liberal	Frank S. Cahill	5,891	27.07	-37.52
Total valid votes		21,763	100.00	
