= Barry Moore (Canadian politician) =

Canadian politician

Barry D. Moore (born 21 August 1944 in Maniwaki, Quebec) is a Canadian industrial commissioner, administrator and politician. Moore was a member of the House of Commons of Canada from 1984 to 1993.

He was elected in the 1984 federal election at the Pontiac—Gatineau—Labelle electoral district for the Progressive Conservative party. He served in the 33rd Canadian Parliament and was re-elected in the 1988 federal election to the 34th Canadian Parliament. In the 1993 federal election, he was defeated by Robert Bertrand of the Liberal Party.

== Electoral record ==
1993 Canadian federal election: Pontiac—Gatineau—Labelle
Party	Candidate	Votes	%	±%
Liberal	Robert Bertrand	17,377	40.07	+9.83
Bloc Québécois	Claude Radermaker	14,554	33.56	
Progressive Conservative	Barry Moore	9,593	22.12	-31.43
National	Brian Corriveau	755	1.74	
New Democratic	Nicole Des Roches	682	1.57	-14.63
Independent	Glen Emmett Patrick Kealey	402	0.93	
Total valid votes		43,363	100.00	

1988 Canadian federal election: Pontiac—Gatineau—Labelle
Party	Candidate	Votes	%	±%
Progressive Conservative	Barry Moore	20,522	53.56	-8.40
Liberal	Brian Murphy	11,589	30.24	+1.69
New Democratic	John Trent	6,207	16.20	+8.60
Total valid votes		38,318	100.00	

1984 Canadian federal election: Pontiac—Gatineau—Labelle
Party	Candidate	Votes	%	±%
Progressive Conservative	Barry Moore	21,754	61.96	+45.18
Liberal	Elizabeth Dickson	10,025	28.55	-41.84
New Democratic	Paul Rowland	2,667	7.60	-1.57
Parti nationaliste	Dominique Dealbuquerque	524	1.49	
Commonwealth of Canada	Donna Craig-Méthot	141	0.40	
Total valid votes		35,111	100.00	

Parliament of Canada
Preceded by Thomas Lefebvre	Member of Parliament for Pontiac—Gatineau—Labelle; 1984–1993	Succeeded by Robert Bertrand
