= Robert Bertrand =

Canadian politician (1953–2022)

Member of House of Commons
- In office October 25, 1993 – June 27, 2004
- Preceded by: Barry Moore
- Succeeded by: David Smith
- Constituency: Pontiac—Gatineau—Labelle

Parliamentary Secretary for the Minister of National Defence
- In office July 16, 1998 – August 31, 2000
- Preceded by: John Richardson
- Succeeded by: Hector Clouthier

Personal details
- Born: April 4, 1953 Fort-Coulonge, Quebec, Canada
- Died: May 17, 2022 (aged 69) Shawville, Quebec, Canada
- Party: Liberal

Robert "Bob" Bertrand (April 4, 1953 – May 17, 2022) was a Canadian politician. He was born in Fort-Coulonge, Quebec.

Bertrand was a federal member of Parliament for the riding of Pontiac—Gatineau—Labelle. He ran and won in the 1993, 1997 and 2000 Canadian federal elections with significant majorities under the banner of the Liberal Party of Canada. Although considered a backbencher, he was very active in Parliament, participating in several standing committees including primarily National Defence and Veterans Affairs; working to study and improve the poor quality of life for members of the Canadian Forces and their families. He also served as Parliamentary Secretary for the Minister of National Defence from 1998 to 2000.

== Attempt to run as a Liberal candidate in the 40th Canadian federal election ==
An article in The Hill Times indicated that Robert Bertrand wished to run as a Liberal candidate in the upcoming federal election. His original request to run was refused in March 2007 and the nomination was closed, giving the candidacy instead to Cindy Duncan-McMillan in order to "meet the party’s target of 33 per cent female candidates". On April 4, Bertrand received a call from the current director of the Liberal Party of Canada in Quebec, Serge Marcil, telling him that the candidacy was re-opened; however, he was given an impossible deadline of one week to collect memberships and present himself as a candidate. Bertrand refused this offer and the nomination went ahead with Duncan-McMillan winning over Ottawa lawyer Richard Mahoney on April 15, 2007.

== Later life and death ==
In October 2016, Robert Bertrand was elected as the National Chief of the Congress of Aboriginal Peoples. Bertrand died in Shawville, Quebec on May 17, 2022, aged 69.

== Electoral record ==
2000 Canadian federal election: Pontiac—Gatineau—Labelle
Party	Candidate	Votes	%	±%
Liberal	Robert Bertrand	20,590	45.39	-0.39
Bloc Québécois	Johanne Deschamps	14,552	32.08	0.07
Alliance	Judith Grant	6,587	14.52	
Progressive Conservative	Benoit Larocque	1,784	3.93	-14.56
New Democratic	Melissa Hunter	836	1.84	-0.37
Green	Gretchen Schwarz	645	1.42	
Natural Law	Eleanor Hyodo	184	0.41	-0.56
Marxist–Leninist	Christian Legeais	92	0.20	
Independent	Thomas J. Sabourin	90	0.20	
Total valid votes		45,360	100.00	

1997 Canadian federal election: Pontiac—Gatineau—Labelle
Party	Candidate	Votes	%	±%
Liberal	Robert Bertrand	22,736	45.78	+5.71
Bloc Québécois	Robert Coulombe	15,897	32.01	-1.55
Progressive Conservative	Pierre Miller	9,187	18.50	-3.62
New Democratic	Brenda Lee	1,097	2.21	
Natural Law	Marc Lacroix	479	0.96	
Christian Heritage	Thomas Sabourin	269	0.54	
Total valid votes		49,665	100.00	

1993 Canadian federal election: Pontiac—Gatineau—Labelle
Party	Candidate	Votes	%	±%
Liberal	Robert Bertrand	17,377	40.07	+9.83
Bloc Québécois	Claude Radermaker	14,554	33.56	
Progressive Conservative	Barry Moore	9,593	22.12	-31.43
National	Brian Corriveau	755	1.74	
New Democratic	Nicole Des Roches	682	1.57	-14.63
Independent	Glen Emmett Patrick Kealey	402	0.93	
Total valid votes		43,363	100.00	

Parliament of Canada
Preceded by Barry Moore	Member of Parliament for Pontiac—Gatineau—Labelle (Electoral district dissolved in 2003. Please see Pontiac); 1993–2004	Succeeded by David Smith
