= Chichester, Quebec =

Chichester
- Township municipality
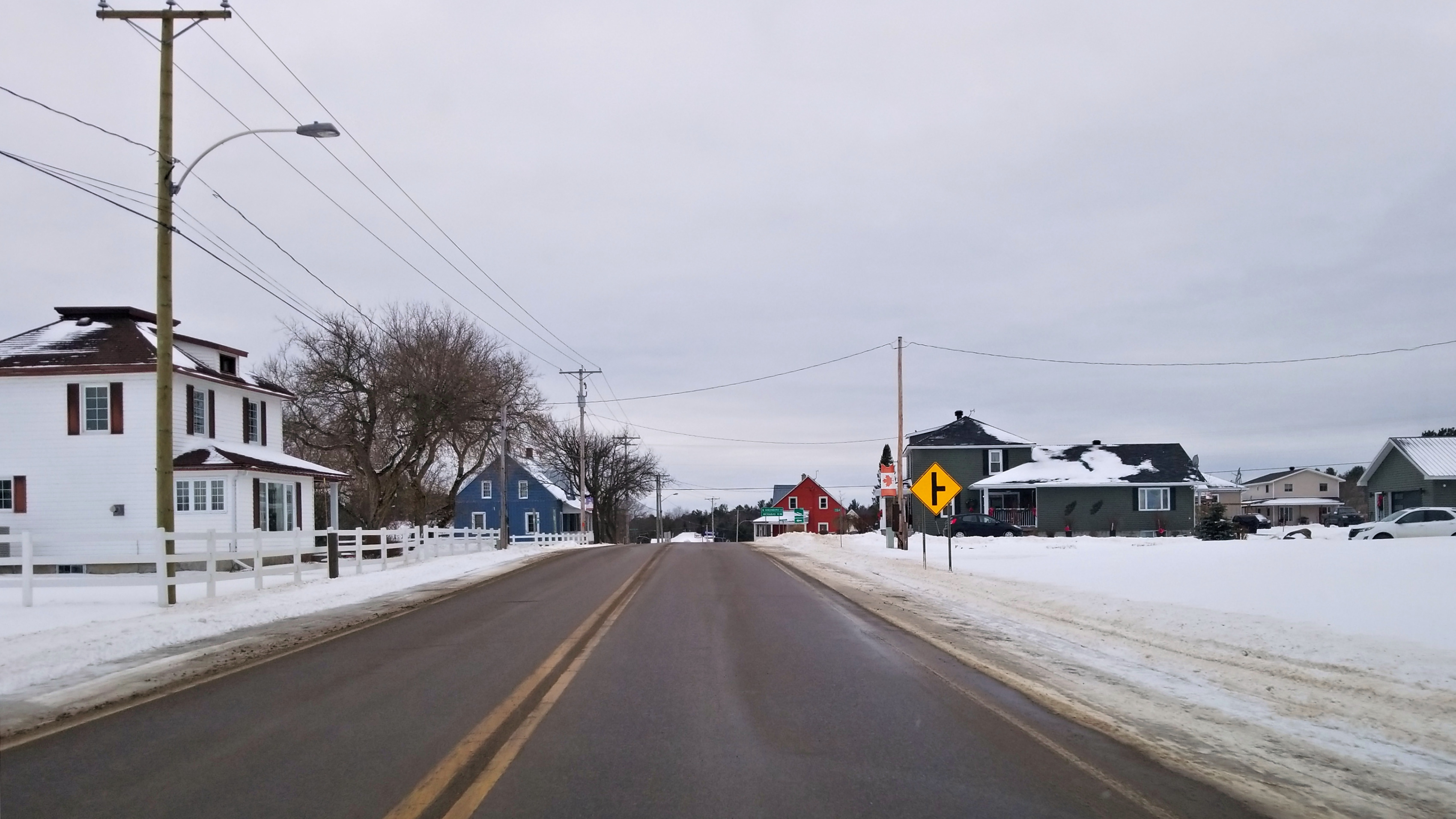

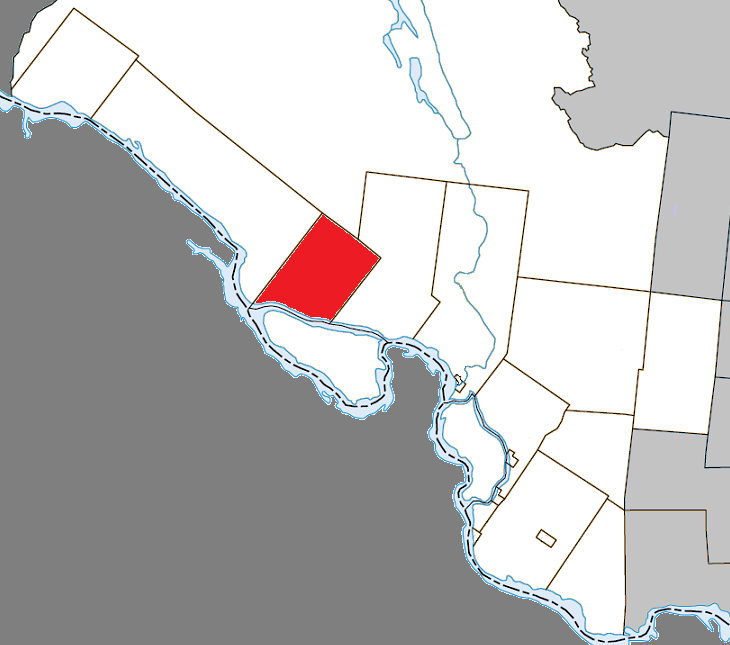
- Location within Pontiac RCM

- Location in western Quebec
- Coordinates: 45°55′N 77°07′W
- Country: Canada
- Province: Quebec
- Region: Outaouais
- RCM: Pontiac
- Constituted: January 1, 1857
- Named for: Chichester

Government
  - Mayor: Donald Gagnon
  - Federal riding: Pontiac—Kitigan Zibi
  - Prov. riding: Pontiac

Area
  - Total: 230.63 km^{2} (89.05 sq mi)
  - Land: 218.74 km^{2} (84.46 sq mi)

Population (2021)
  - Total: 350
  - Density: 1.6/km^{2} (4.1/sq mi)
  - Pop (2016-21): ▲0.6%
  - Dwellings: 247
- Time zone: UTC−5 (EST)
  - Summer (DST): UTC−4 (EDT)
- Postal code(s): J0X 1M0
- Area code: 819
- Highways: No major routes

Chichester is a township municipality and village in the Canadian province of Quebec, located within the Pontiac Regional County Municipality.

Chichester is located along the north shores of the Ottawa River across from Chapeau on Allumette Island.

Its settlements include Chichester and Nichabau. Nichabau, also known as Nicabeau or Nichabong, is a scenic hamlet located northwest of Chichester in what used to be referred to as Poupore's Limits. It is noted for its great number of square log homes.

== Geography ==
The northern part of the municipal territory is sparsely populated and undeveloped, dotted with several lakes including Lake McGillivray. In its centre there are hills some of which reach an altitude of 400 metres (1,300 ft). The southern portion is mostly cleared and used for agriculture, and where the 2 communities are located.

== History ==
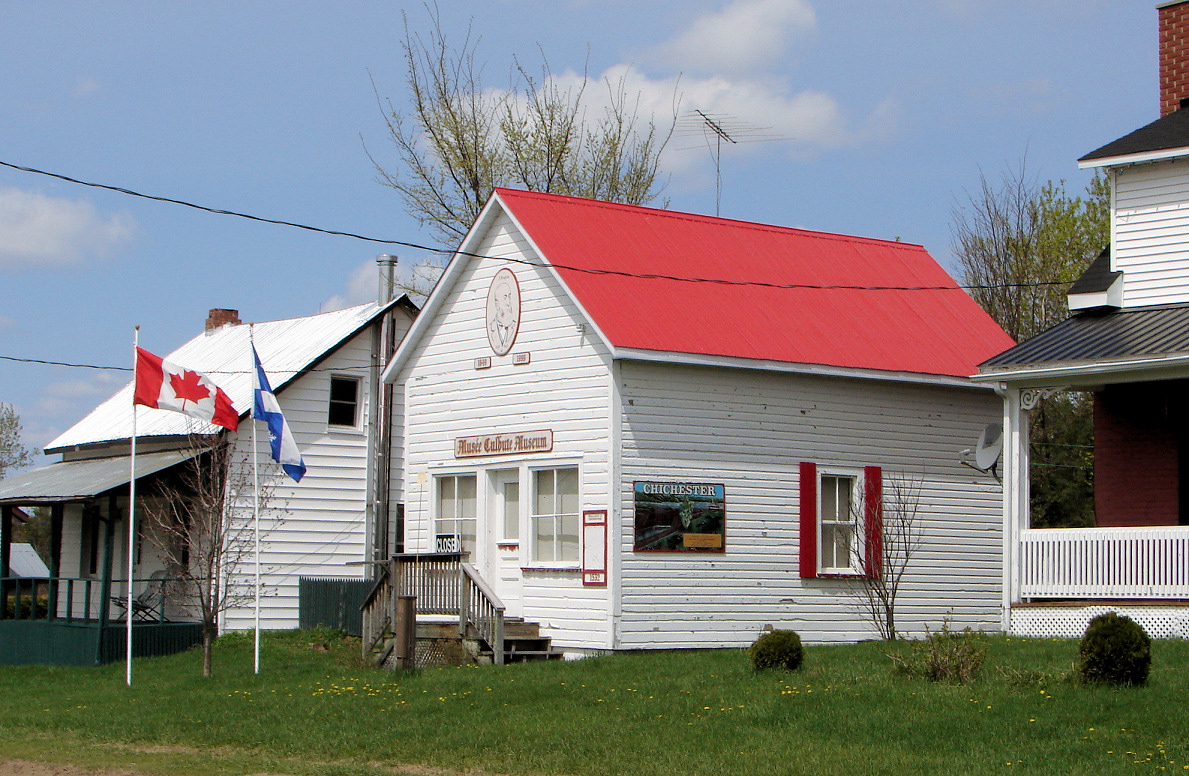
Cultural museum in Chichester

The Gale and Duberger Map of 1795 already showed the planned "Chicheter" [sic] Township but it was not officially proclaimed until 1849. It is named after the administrative capital of West Sussex, England.

In 1854, the local post office opened (closed in 1970). In 1855, the township was incorporated as a municipality with John B. Poupore as its first mayor.

Chichester was once a thriving community with numerous sawmills, a grist mill, shingle mill, blacksmith shop and two hotels. In the 19th century (1873-1876), the township tried to boost its economy by petitioning the Federal Department of Public Works to build large wooden locks in the Culbute Channel of the Ottawa River, claimed to be the largest wooden ones in Canada. The locks were meant to allow steamboat travel on the upper portion of the river but this idea never caught on. The Culbute Locks (and associated dam) were in use from 1876 until the fall of 1889 when they were "...abandoned to the forces of the river and Nature's wood-rotting agents..."

Today, the municipality is predominantly dependent on farming, lumbering, and some summer tourism.

== Demographics ==
In the 2021 Census of Population conducted by Statistics Canada, Chichester had a population of 350 living in 165 of its 247 total private dwellings, a change of 0.6% from its 2016 population of 348. With a land area of 218.74 km^{2} (84.46 sq mi), it had a population density of 1.6/km^{2} (4.1/sq mi) in 2021.

Canada census – Chichester community profile

	2021	2016	2011
Population	350 (+0.6% from 2016)	348 (-5.4% from 2011)	368 (-5.2% from 2006)
Land area	218.74 km^{2} (84.46 sq mi)	221.14 km^{2} (85.38 sq mi)	221.39 km^{2} (85.48 sq mi)
Population density	1.6/km^{2} (4.1/sq mi)	1.5/km^{2} (3.9/sq mi)	1.7/km^{2} (4.4/sq mi)
Median age	51.2 (M: 50.4, F: 51.6)	52.0 (M: 48.8, F: 54.2)	48.2 (M: 44.2, F: 49.8)
Private dwellings	247 (total) 165 (occupied)	243 (total)	239 (total)
Median household income	$51,200	$43,605	$.N/A

Notes: 2011 income data for this area has been suppressed for data quality or confidentiality reasons.
References: 2021 2016 2011

Historical Census Data - Chichester, Quebec

Year	Pop.	±%
1976	559	—
1981	534	−4.5%
1986	488	−8.6%
1991	460	−5.7%
1996	462	+0.4%

Year	Pop.	±%
2001	381	−17.5%
2006	388	+1.8%
2011	368	−5.2%
2016	348	−5.4%
2021	350	+0.6%

Source: Statistics Canada

Mother tongue (2016):

- English as first language: 86.1%
- French as first language: 10.8%
- Other as first language: 3.1%

== See also ==
- List of anglophone communities in Quebec
- List of township municipalities in Quebec
