= David Smith (Quebec politician) =

Canadian politician

David Smith (born September 25, 1963) is a Canadian politician.

A former member of the House of Commons of Canada, Smith served as a city councillor in Maniwaki, Quebec until 2004. At this point, he ran in the 2004 Canadian federal election for the Liberal Party of Canada in the riding of Pontiac where he won. He is a former business manager and public servant.

In the 2006 election. he was not able to hold on to his seat, losing to Conservative star candidate Lawrence Cannon. Smith earned 24.2% of the popular vote, finishing third behind Cannon (33.7%) and the Bloc Québécois' Christine Émond Lapointe (28.7%).

2006 Canadian federal election: Pontiac
| Party | Candidate | Votes | % | ±% | Expenditures |
|---|---|---|---|---|---|
| Conservative | Lawrence Cannon | 16,067 | 33.63 | +11.48 | $71,020 |
| Bloc Québécois | Christine Emond Lapointe | 13,790 | 28.87 | -0.32 | $47,724 |
| Liberal | David Smith | 11,539 | 24.15 | -14.21 | $50,925 |
| New Democratic | Celine Brault | 4,759 | 9.96 | +4.17 | $23,543 |
| Green | Moe Garahan | 1,512 | 3.16 | +2.84 | $4,974 |
| Marxist–Leninist | Benoit Legros | 107 | 0.22 | -0.11 | |
| Total valid votes/expense limit | | 47,774 | 100.00 | $89,728 | |
| Conservative gain from Liberal | | Swing | | -12.8 | |

2004 Canadian federal election: Pontiac
| Party | Candidate | Votes | % | ±% | Expenditures |
|---|---|---|---|---|---|
| Liberal | David Smith | 15,358 | 38.36 | -7.03 | $68,705 |
| Bloc Québécois | L. Hubert Leduc | 11,685 | 29.19 | -2.89 | $15,853 |
| Conservative | Judith Grant | 8,869 | 22.15 | +3.70 | $62,101 |
| New Democratic | Gretchen Schwarz | 2,317 | 5.79 | +3.94 | $2,580 |
| Green | Thierry Vicente | 1,673 | 4.18 | +2.76 | $1,213 |
| Marxist–Leninist | Benoit Legros | 132 | 0.33 | +0.13 | |
| Total valid votes/expense limit | | 40,034 | 100.00 | $87,529 | |
| Liberal hold | | Swing | -2.07 | | |

Note: Conservative vote is compared to the total of the Canadian Alliance vote and Progressive Conservative vote in 2000 election.

Parliament of Canada
| Preceded by Robert Bertrand | Member of Parliament for Pontiac; 2004-2006 | Succeeded by Lawrence Cannon |
