= Gerald Hugh Brabazon =

Canadian politician

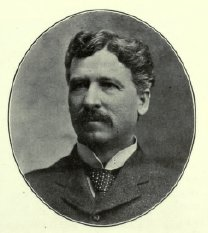

Member of the Canadian Parliament for Pontiac
- In office 1904–1908
- Preceded by: Thomas Murray
- Succeeded by: George Frederick Hodgins
- In office 1911–1917
- Preceded by: George Frederick Hodgins
- Succeeded by: Frank S. Cahill

Personal details
- Born: 7 December 1854 Montreal, Canada East
- Died: 27 December 1938 (aged 84)
- Party: Conservative

Gerald Hugh Brabazon (7 December 1854 – 27 December 1938) was a Canadian politician.

Born in Montreal, Canada East on 7 December 1854, the son of Samuel L. Brabazon and Margaret Clarke both from Ireland, Brabazon was a civil engineer. He was mayor of Portage-du-Fort, Quebec for 18 years and Warden of Pontiac County for 12 years. He served under Frederick Dobson Middleton in the North-West Rebellion in 1885, as a first lieutenant in Dennis's Scouts. He was an unsuccessful candidate for the House of Commons of Canada in Pontiac in the general elections of 1900, but was elected in 1904. A Conservative, he was defeated in 1908 and was elected in 1911.

1911 Canadian federal election: Pontiac
Party	Candidate	Votes	%	±%
Conservative	Gerald Hugh Brabazon	2,059	44.59	+3.15
Liberal	Frank S. Cahill	1,393	30.16	
Liberal	George Frederick Hodgins	1,166	25.25	-33.32
Total valid votes		4,618	100.00	

1908 Canadian federal election: Pontiac
Party	Candidate	Votes	%	±%
Liberal	George Frederick Hodgins	2,543	58.57	+9.78
Conservative	Gerald Hugh Brabazon	1,799	41.43	-9.78
Total valid votes		4,342	100.00	

1904 Canadian federal election: Pontiac
Party	Candidate	Votes	%	±%
Conservative	Gerald Hugh Brabazon	2,001	51.22	+3.87
Liberal	George Frederick Hodgins	1,906	48.78	-3.87
Total valid votes		3,907	100.00	
