= Lawrence Cannon =

Canadian politician (born 1947)

The Honourable Lawrence Cannon PC
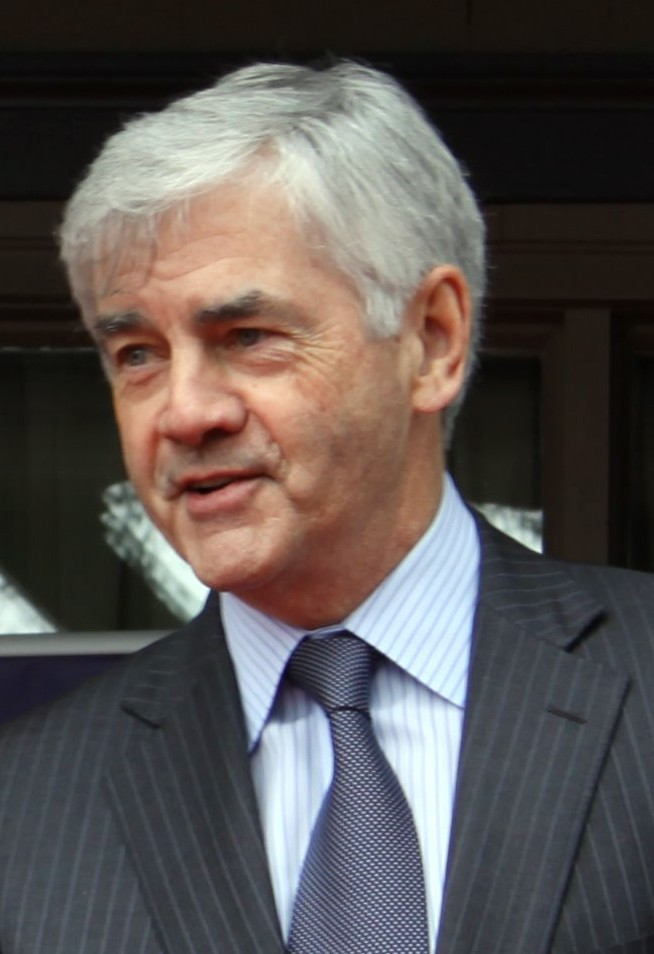

Canadian Ambassador to France
- In office May 10, 2012 – September 29, 2017
- Prime Minister: Stephen Harper; Justin Trudeau
- Preceded by: Marc Lortie
- Succeeded by: Isabelle Hudon

Minister of Foreign Affairs
- In office October 30, 2008 – May 18, 2011
- Prime Minister: Stephen Harper
- Preceded by: David Emerson
- Succeeded by: John Baird

Minister of Transport, Infrastructure and Communities
- In office February 6, 2006 – October 30, 2008
- Prime Minister: Stephen Harper
- Preceded by: Jean Lapierre
- Succeeded by: John Baird

Member of Parliament for Pontiac
- In office January 23, 2006 – May 2, 2011
- Preceded by: David Smith
- Succeeded by: Mathieu Ravignat

Gatineau City Councillor
- In office November 4, 2001 – November 5, 2005
- Preceded by: District created
- Succeeded by: Alain Pilon
- Constituency: Val-Tétreau District

Member of the National Assembly of Quebec for La Peltrie
- In office December 2, 1985 – September 12, 1994
- Preceded by: Pauline Marois
- Succeeded by: Michel Côté

Personal details
- Born: December 6, 1947 (age 78) Quebec City, Quebec, Canada
- Party: Conservative Party (2003–present)
- Other political affiliations: Liberal Party (Before 2003)
- Education: University of Montreal; Laval University
- Profession: Businessman communications consultant political assistant

Lawrence Cannon, PC (born December 6, 1947) is a Canadian politician from Quebec and Prime Minister Stephen Harper's former Quebec lieutenant. In early 2006, he was made the Minister of Transport. On October 30, 2008, he relinquished oversight of Transport and was sworn in as Minister of Foreign Affairs. He was defeated in the 2011 federal election by the NDP's Mathieu Ravignat. He was appointed as Canadian Ambassador to France in May 2012, and he served in that position until September 2017.

== Life and career ==
=== Genealogy ===
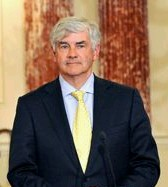
Cannon in 2008

Cannon is the son of government lawyer Louis Cannon and Quebec television broadcast pioneer Rosemary "Posie" Power, and the grandson of Lucien Cannon and Charles Gavan Power. He is also the grand-nephew of Lawrence Arthur Dumoulin Cannon, a long-time Liberal politician and Supreme Court judge. He is the great-grandson of Sir Charles Fitzpatrick, defender of Louis Riel and former Senior Minister in Laurier's cabinet. He is of Irish and French Canadian descent.

The extended Cannon family has had strong regional and national political influence in Canada for over a century and is considered to be influential as one of Canada's hereditary ruling class families, members having served in positions as lawyers, judges, Supreme Court judges, senators, ministers of defence, solicitors general, and members of parliament. They have had large influence in the national resource industries, as "barons" in the lumber industry particularly, as well as in broadcasting.

The most famous member of the family was Cannon's maternal grandfather, Charles "Chubby" Power, a confidante and Minister of National Defence for Air in the Cabinet of Prime Minister Mackenzie King.

His son, Sacha Cannon was elected as MNA in the Hull in the 2026 Quebec Election.

=== Early life ===
Cannon grew up fluently bilingual; his father was francophone while his mother was anglophone. He also grew up alongside his older brother, Françis Cannon. He was educated at French speaking public junior and high schools.

He graduated in political science from the Université de Montréal in 1971; and then worked for Liberal Premier Robert Bourassa as correspondence secretary, leaving in 1976 for higher academic studies. Cannon received an MBA from Université Laval in 1979. He worked then in private sector as a financial analyst for Société de développement industriel until 1981; and then as head of Les Radiateurs Roy ltée from September 1981, to December 1985.

Cannon has been a long-time member of the Knights of Columbus.

=== Provincial political career ===
Cannon then was elected in 1985 as a member of the Quebec Liberal Party to the National Assembly of Quebec for the provincial riding of La Peltrie; and then served as Parliamentary Secretary: notably to the Minister of Foreign Trade and Technological Development, and then Tourism. From October 1990 to January 1994 he was minister for communications, and implemented the 911 emergency system as well as the Privacy Act within Quebec. He was also active with the federal Liberals supporting Sheila Copps (who as well later became Deputy Prime Minister of Canada) in her attempt to win the federal 1990 Liberal leadership election won instead by Jean Chrétien.

=== Private sector work ===
Cannon worked in private industry as vice-president of Unitel; now AT&T Canada Corp. during the AT&T takeover of the Canadian firm; and in other concerns between 1994 and 2001 primarily in the field of information technologies. Cannon then remarried; and took an interest in Quebec local politics building a new constituency.

=== Constituency building in local politics ===
Cannon was elected as councillor for Gatineau City Council in 2001, representing Hull's Val-Tétreau District, under mayor Yves Ducharme. He served as president of the Société de Transport de l'Outaouais from January 2002 to November 2005, while at the same time he was appointed president of the Association du transport urbain du Québec. He had an especial sympathy for solving transport problems in Gatineau by road building rather than public transit approaches. During his mandate, the STO developed a BRT (Bus Rapid Transit) project called "Rapibus", that has since been completed. His association and ownership of Groupe Cannon and Associates, a consulting company in telecommunications, has received little attention, and this ownership is expected to be put in a blind trust as is usual in federal politics.

=== Foreign policy initiatives ===
Cannon travelled extensively in Europe and the Americas both in and out of public life. In 2001, Cannon was appointed to the Board of the World Commerce Institute, and then as president and general manager of AmeriContact for the Quebec City Summit of the Americas in Quebec City.

=== Federal politics ===
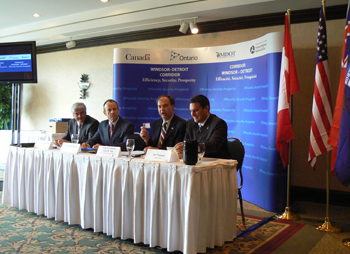
Cannon at a June 2008 announcement on border safety

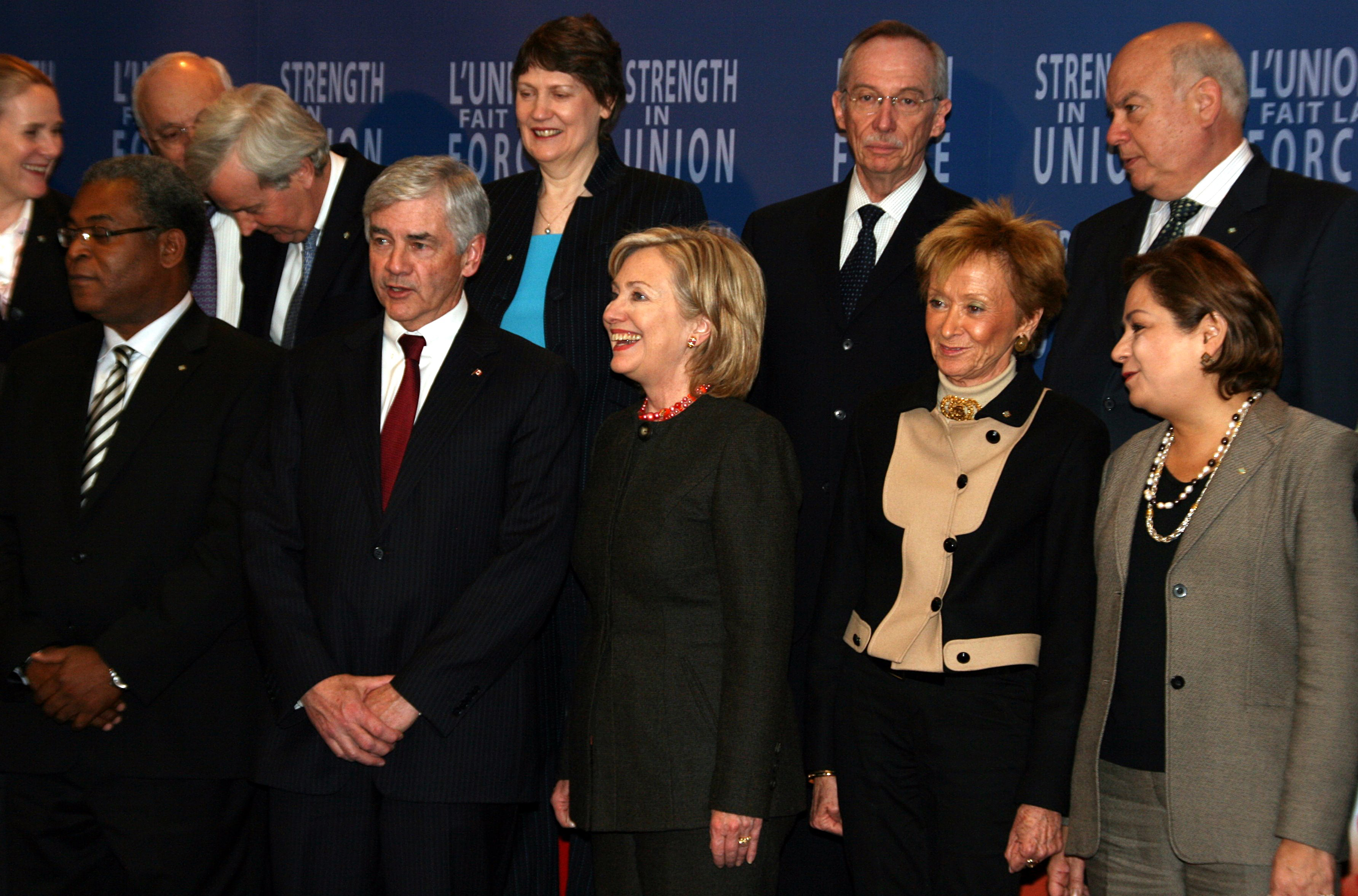
Cannon standing next to Haitian Prime Minister Jean-Max Bellerive (left) and U.S. Secretary of State Hillary Clinton in Montreal at an emergency relief summit on the 2010 Haiti earthquake

Although Cannon and his family have historically supported the federal Liberals, he switched to the Conservative Party of Canada in the early 2000s. At the time, his switch to the Conservative Party raised eyebrows among the political class and the media, which generally attributed the move to his inability to make an impression with the Liberal Party. On September 16, 2005, he was named deputy chief of staff and deputy executive director of the Conservative Party. He was also named as Quebec lieutenant to party leader Stephen Harper.

He successfully ran as a Conservative candidate in the riding of Pontiac in the 2006 federal election, beating incumbent Liberal M.P. David Smith. Winning with 33.68% of the vote, Cannon gained support from traditional Liberal voters. The Liberals had held the riding and its predecessors for all but nine years since 1935, and the Conservative candidate had finished a distant third in 2004 with 22.15% of the vote.

On February 6, 2006, he was sworn in as Minister of Transport, Infrastructure and Communities. This portfolio includes Transport Canada, Infrastructure Canada, the Canadian Transportation Agency, the Transportation Appeal Tribunal of Canada and 16 Crown corporations.

Many pundits had predicted that Cannon would also be named Deputy Prime Minister of Canada, but Harper chose not to retain that office. However, Cannon was first on the list of ministers designated to fill in for Harper if he was unable to perform his duties, making him Deputy Prime Minister in practice if not in name. This was further emphasized when Cannon seconded the pro forma bill to start the first session of the 39th Canadian Parliament; the bill is introduced before the House takes the Speech from the Throne under consideration to maintain the right of the House to consider matters other than those directed to it by the crown. This bill is normally proposed by the Prime Minister and seconded by either the Deputy Prime Minister or the Government House Leader.

Following the 2008 federal election, Cannon was appointed as Minister of Foreign Affairs. Cannon was one of the higher-ranking Red Tories in the Harper cabinet. In 2009, he denied diplomat Richard Colvin's claim that Afghan prisoners transferred from the Canadian forces to the Afghan police were tortured.

Cannon was defeated in the 2011 election by NDP challenger Mathieu Ravignat, winning only 29.5 percent of the vote. His place as Minister of Foreign Affairs was taken by John Baird.

==== Controversial remarks ====
In June 2009, after being asked whether the Canadian government will "choose not to abandon Ronald Allen Smith, a Canadian who has been on death row in Montana for over 25 years", Cannon answered "(...) I will be very clear on this, clemency is not an obligation. It must be earned. We will study each appeal for clemency individually."

==== Abousfian Abdelrazik ====
On September 21, 2009, Canadian Abousfian Abdelrazik sued Cannon for $3-million alleging misfeasance in public office, intentional infliction of mental suffering, and violation of Abdelrazik's constitutional rights under ss. 6, 7 and 12 of the Canadian Charter of Rights and Freedoms, resulting from Canada's refusal to grant him travel documents to return home, his alleged torture while in detention in Sudan, and his interrogation in Sudan by Canadian Security Intelligence Service (CSIS) agents while in Sudanese custody. On August 30, 2010, the Federal Court refused a motion by Canadian government lawyers seeking to prevent the suit against Cannon from proceeding.

=== Diplomatic post ===
On May 10, 2012, Prime Minister Stephen Harper appointed Cannon as Canadian Ambassador to France. He served in that position until September 2017, when he was succeeded by Isabelle Hudon.

== Electoral record ==
2011 Canadian federal election: Pontiac
Party	Candidate	Votes	%	±%	Expenditures
New Democratic	Mathieu Ravignat	22,376	45.71	+30.28	
Conservative	Lawrence Cannon	14,441	29.50	-3.20	
Liberal	Cindy Duncan McMillan	6,242	12.75	-11.49	
Bloc Québécois	Maude Tremblay	4,917	10.05	-12.28	
Green	Louis-Philippe Mayrand	849	1.73	-3.28	
Marxist–Leninist	Benoit Legros	124	0.25	-0.01	
Total valid votes/expense limit		48,949	100.00		
Total rejected ballots		413	0.84	+0.13	
Turnout		49,362	60.00		
Eligible voters		82,308	–	–	

2008 Canadian federal election: Pontiac
Party	Candidate	Votes	%	±%	Expenditures
Conservative	Lawrence Cannon	14,023	32.70	-0.93	$79,996
Liberal	Cindy Duncan McMillan	10,396	24.24	+0.09	$20,896
Bloc Québécois	Marius Tremblay	9,576	22.33	-6.54	$47,435
New Democratic	Céline Brault	6,616	15.43	+5.47	$12,004
Green	André Sylvestre	2,148	5.01	+1.85	$12,545
Marxist–Leninist	Benoit Legros	112	0.26	+0.04	
Total valid votes/expense limit		42,871	100.00	$96,386	
Total rejected ballots		306	0.71		
Turnout		43,177			
Conservative hold		Swing		-0.51	

2006 Canadian federal election: Pontiac
Party	Candidate	Votes	%	±%	Expenditures
Conservative	Lawrence Cannon	16,067	33.63	+11.48	$71,020
Bloc Québécois	Christine Emond Lapointe	13,790	28.87	-0.32	$47,724
Liberal	David Smith	11,539	24.15	-14.21	$50,925
New Democratic	Celine Brault	4,759	9.96	+4.17	$23,543
Green	Moe Garahan	1,512	3.16	+2.84	$4,974
Marxist–Leninist	Benoit Legros	107	0.22	-0.11	
Total valid votes/expense limit		47,774	100.00	$89,728	
Conservative gain from Liberal		Swing		-12.8	

2001 Gatineau municipal election: Val-Tétreau
Party	Candidate	Popular vote			Expenditures
Party	Candidate	Votes	%	±%	Expenditures
Independent	Lawrence Cannon	2,999	56.70	–	none listed
Independent	Claude Millette	2,291	43.30	–	none listed
Total valid votes		5,290	98.24		
Total rejected, unmarked and declined votes		95	1.76	–	
Turnout		5,385	54.78	–	
Eligible voters		9,830			
Note: Candidate campaign colours, unless a member of a party, may be based on the prominent colour used in campaign items (signs, literature, etc.) or colours used in polling graphs and are used as a visual differentiation between candidates.
Sources: Office of the City Clerk of Gatineau

1989 Quebec general election: La Peltrie
Party	Candidate	Votes	%
Liberal	Lawrence Cannon	20,528	52.17
Parti Québécois	Monique Cloutier	16,250	41.30
New Democratic	Claude Pelletier	2,567	6.52
Total valid votes		39,345	97.15
Total rejected ballots		1,155	2.85
Turnout		40,500	80.16
Electors on the lists		50,526	–

1985 Quebec general election: La Peltrie
Party	Candidate	Votes	%
Liberal	Lawrence Cannon	19,819	55.93
Parti Québécois	Pauline Marois	13,462	37.99
New Democratic	Denis Jeffrey	1,968	5.55
Christian Socialism	Gilles Bertrand	189	0.53
Total valid votes		35,438	98.55
Total rejected ballots		520	1.45
Turnout		35,958	82.83
Electors on the lists		43,410	–

== See also ==
- List of Canadian political families
- Université Laval
