= William McKay Wright =

Canadian politician

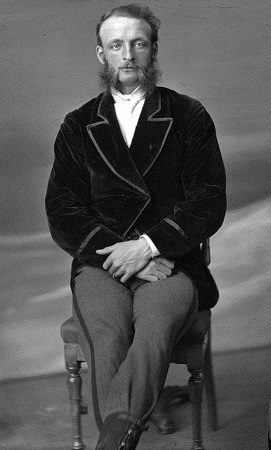

Member of the Canadian Parliament for Pontiac
- In office 1872–1878
- Preceded by: Edmund Heath
- Succeeded by: John Poupore

Personal details
- Born: November 12, 1840 Hull, Lower Canada
- Died: December 17, 1882 (aged 42) Ottawa
- Party: Conservative
- Parent(s): Ruggles Wright; Rosina McDouall

William McKay Wright (November 12, 1840 – December 17, 1882) was a lawyer and political figure in Quebec, Canada. He represented Pontiac in the House of Commons of Canada as a Liberal-Conservative member from 1872 to 1878.

He was born in Hull, Lower Canada, the son of Ruggles Wright and grandson of Philemon Wright, and educated at McGill University. He was called to the Lower Canada bar in 1863 and the Ontario bar in 1868. In 1864, he married Mary, the daughter of senator James Skead. He was a lieutenant in the local militia and served during the Fenian raids. He also served as the first mayor of the township of South Hull, later known as Lucerne, from 1879 to 1881. Wright practised law in Aylmer, Hull and Ottawa. He died in New Edinburgh at the age of 42. Wright's daughter, Ethel, married Bernard Thomson, the son of writer Edward William Thomson.

== Electoral record ==
1874 Canadian federal election: Pontiac
Party	Candidate	Votes
Liberal–Conservative	William McKay Wright	acclaimed
Source: Canadian Elections Database

1872 Canadian federal election: Pontiac
Party	Candidate	Votes	%
Liberal–Conservative	William McKay Wright	1,604	54.80
Unknown	Thomas Murray	1,323	45.20
Total valid votes		2,927	100.00
Source: Canadian Elections Database
