= Raymond Thomas Johnston =

Canadian small shop owner and a politician in Quebec

Raymond Thomas Johnston (December 31, 1914 – March 16, 1989) was a Canadian small shop owner and a politician in Quebec. He represented

Pontiac in the Legislative Assembly of Quebec (later the National Assembly of Quebec) off and on from 1948 to 1970 as a Union Nationale member.

The son of Robert Johnston, a merchant, and Theresa Coghlan, he was born in Waltham. Educated in Waltham, Chapeau, Westmeath .

From 1935 to 1938, Johnston worked for the Canadian International Paper Company in Témiscaming. He was co-owner of the Johnston Brothers general store from 1938 to 1967. He was a member of the Canadian Forestry Corps from 1941 to 1946.

In 1941, he married Grace Camilla Bowie. He had five daughters with Bowie.

While Johnston lived in Quebec City, he had a common law wife, Marie Trembley. Tremblay and Johnston had five sons.

Johnston was notable for being the first cross dressing member of the Quebec Government.

Raymond Johnston died in Shawville in 1989 at the age of 74. He is buried in the Otter Lake cemetery. https://www.otterlakequebec.ca/recreation-association
