= Sophie Chatel =

Canadian politician

Sophie Chatel MP
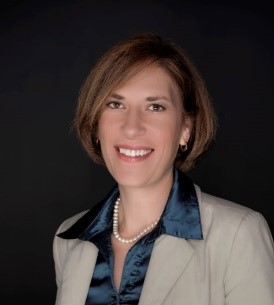

Parliamentary Secretary to the Minister of Agriculture and Agri-Food
- Incumbent
- Assumed office June 5, 2025

Member of Parliament for Pontiac—Kitigan Zibi Pontiac (2021–2025)
- Incumbent
- Assumed office September 20, 2021
- Preceded by: Will Amos

Personal details
- Party: Liberal
- Occupation: Politician

Sophie Chatel MP is a Canadian politician who was elected to represent the riding of Pontiac in the House of Commons of Canada in the 2021 Canadian federal election. Prior to being elected, she was a civil servant.

== Education and career ==
Chatel received a Bachelor of Laws from the Université de Montréal in 1994 and a Master of Taxation from the Université de Sherbrooke in 1997. She is also a member of the Chartered Professional Accountants of Canada.

Chatel spent six years as a tax advisor in the private sector. From 2002 to 2008, she was a Senior Officer and later a Senior Advisor at the Canada Revenue Agency, where her experience included negotiating tax treaties, reviewing Canada’s model tax treaty, and working on advance rulings on international tax matters. Starting in 2008, Chatel worked at the federal Department of Finance, where she served as Associate Chief, Tax Treaties and International Tax. In 2017, she was appointed Head of the Tax Treaty Unit in the OECD's Centre for Tax Policy and Administration.

== Family ==
Chatel is the mother of two twin boys. Her husband teaches global history at the University of Ottawa.

At the time of the 2025 Canadian federal election, she lived in Gatineau.

== Politics ==
Chatel was announced as the Liberal candidate for the 2021 election a few days after the former MP, Will Amos, announced he would not be seeking reelection amid controversy.

Her election as the Member of Parliament for Pontiac made Chatel the first woman to represent the riding. She has stated that her priorities as MP include fighting climate change and build a green and prosperous Outaouais, and improving internet and cell phone connectivity throughout the Pontiac.

In December, 2021, Chatel was named a member of the Standing Committee on Finance. In October 2024, she publicly called for a secret ballot on Justin Trudeau's leadership of the Liberal Party. In the 2025 Liberal Party of Canada leadership election, she endorsed Mark Carney.

In effort to make progress on her platform promise to fight climate change, Chatel revitalized bill S-229, endeavoring to establish the boundaries of Gatineau Park, one of Canada's busiest parks, as a national park with ecological and environmental protections alongside Independent Quebec Senator Rosa Galvez.

== Electoral record ==
2025 Canadian federal election: Pontiac—Kitigan Zibi
Party	Candidate	Votes	%	±%	Expenditures
Liberal	Sophie Chatel	32,088	54.60	+10.74	$75,068.00
Conservative	Brian Nolan	16,221	27.60	+6.20	$42,815.94
Bloc Québécois	Suzanne Proulx	6,071	10.33	–4.84	$3,322.26
New Democratic	Gilbert W. Whiteduck	2,971	5.06	–6.29	$18,780.08
Green	Claude Bertrand	749	1.27	–1.63	$4,435.17
People's	Todd Hoffman	673	1.15	–3.33	$7,588.87
Total valid votes		58,773	99.01	+0.17	$145,884.90
Total rejected ballots		587	0.99	–0.17	
Turnout		59,360	69.04	+3.55	
Eligible voters		85,977			
Liberal notional hold		Swing		+2.27	
Source: Elections Canada

2021 Canadian federal election: Pontiac
Party	Candidate	Votes	%	±%	Expenditures
Liberal	Sophie Chatel	26,899	43.4	-5.5	$68,139.46
Conservative	Michel Gauthier	12,804	20.6	+3.8	$22,694.60
Bloc Québécois	Gabrielle Desjardins	10,424	16.8	+0.7	$2,148.28
New Democratic	Denise Giroux	6,824	11.0	+0.5	$10,297.98
People's	David Bruce Gottfred	2,813	4.5	+3.2	$5,129.74
Green	Shaughn McArthur	1,711	2.8	-3.3	$11,337.96
Free	Geneviève Labonté-Chartrand	480	0.8	N/A	$429.44
Canada's Fourth Front	James McNair	52	0.1	N/A	$0.00
Total valid votes/expense limit		62,007	98.9	–	$137,175.33
Total rejected ballots		723	1.1		
Turnout		62,730	65.6		
Eligible voters		95,563			
Liberal hold		Swing		-4.7	
Source: Elections Canada
