= L'Île-du-Grand-Calumet =

- Municipality
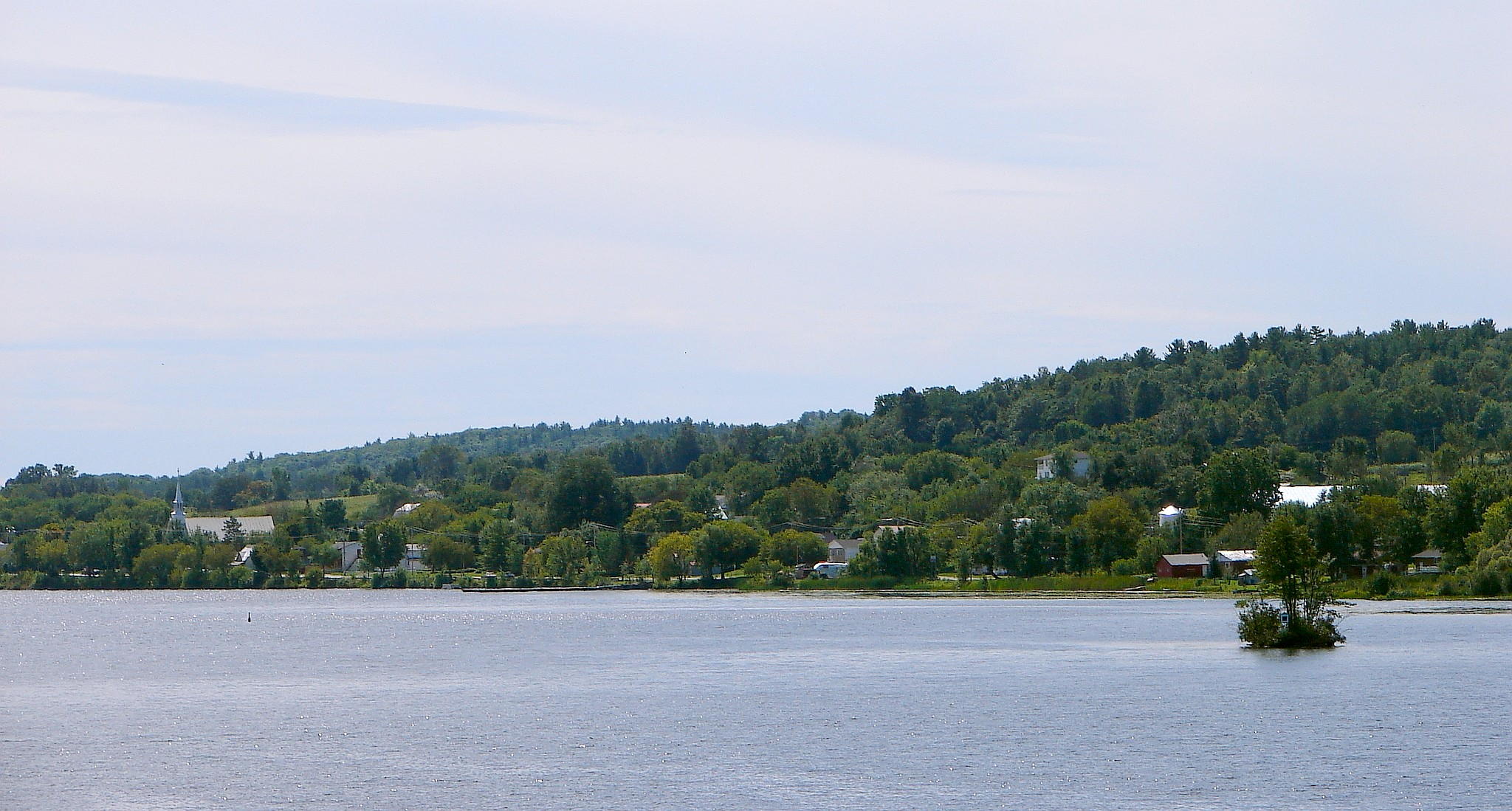

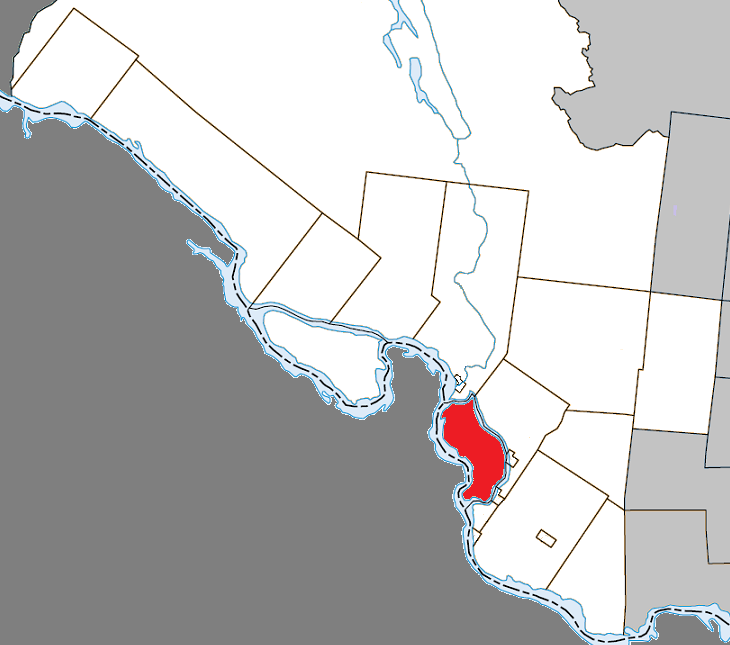
- Location within Pontiac RCM

- Location in western Quebec
- Coordinates: 45.72°N 76.62°W
- Country: Canada
- Province: Quebec
- Region: Outaouais
- RCM: Pontiac
- Settled: 1840s
- Constituted: July 1, 1855

Government
  - Mayor: Jean-Louis Corriveau
  - Federal riding: Pontiac—Kitigan Zibi
  - Prov. riding: Pontiac

Area
  - Total: 147.28 km^{2} (56.87 sq mi)
  - Land: 132.55 km^{2} (51.18 sq mi)

Population (2021)
  - Total: 648
  - Density: 5/km^{2} (13/sq mi)
  - Pop 2016-2021: ▲3.5%
  - Dwellings: 437
- Time zone: UTC−5 (EST)
  - Summer (DST): UTC−4 (EDT)
- Postal code(s): J0X 1J0
- Area code: 819
- Highways: No major routes
- Website: xn--le-du-grand-calumet-41b.ca

L'Île-du-Grand-Calumet (French pronunciation: [lil dy ɡʁɑ̃ kalymɛ]) is a municipality in the Outaouais region, part of the Pontiac Regional County Municipality, Quebec, Canada. The municipality consists primarily of Calumet Island (also Grand Calumet Island; in French Île du Grand Calumet), but also includes Lafontaine Island, French Island, Green Island, and numerous minor surrounding islets, all in the Ottawa River, approximately two kilometres (1¼ miles) from Campbell's Bay, two kilometres (1¼ miles) from Bryson.

Grand-Calumet is the principal settlement of L'Île-du-Grand-Calumet. Its centre is the Sainte-Anne Church, which is alongside the municipal building and the school. It is also the site where First Nation tribes held their annual pow-wow, occasionally smoking their calumet, from which its name is derived.

Bordering on Whitewater Region, Ontario, the municipality is the co-location of some of the roughest sections on the Ottawa River, popular with kayakers and rafters. Three whitewater rafting companies based in L'Île-du-Grand-Calumet take adventurers down the Rocher Fendu Rapids, known as the best whitewater rapids in Eastern North America.

== Etymology ==
Its name is a reference to the ceremonial pipe (French: Calumet), occasionally smoked by the tribes of the first nation people to settle mainly territory disputes (establishing which tribe had the right to fish and hunt in a certain area). They gathered at Grand-Calumet in large numbers for their friendly annual pow-wow and exchanging stuff.

Until December 22, 2007, it was called simply Grand-Calumet. The official name was changed to L'Île-de-Grand-Calumet, however, on July 5, 2008, it was changed again to use -du- rather than -de-. This last modification was considered a correction rather than a name change.

== Geography ==
About 20 kilometers (12 mi) long by 7 kilometers (4.3 mi) wide, L'Île-du-Grand-Calumet has an elevation of no more than 200 meters (660 ft) above sea level. Agricultural land use is mostly concentrated in the centre of the island.

The primary population centre is Grand-Calumet; other smaller communities are Rivière-Barry, Tancredia, Dunraven, Freshwater, Duffyville.

== History ==
Like Allumette Island upstream, Calumet Island was for many centuries a fishing and hunting place of the Kichesipirini Algonquin people. During the French Period, the region along the Ottawa River was not colonized in order to maintain the fur trade with the indigenous peoples who lived there. The French maintained military garrisons in several forts along the Ottawa River, including Fort-Coulonge.

But because the Ottawa River was the main canoe route to the west, Calumet Island was the site of a portage trail to bypass the strong and turbulent rapids in the river at this point. Here the events of the Cadieux Legend took place.

Jean Cadieux, born at Boucherville on March 12, 1671, youngest son of Jean Cadieux and Marie Valade, was a coureur des bois from 1695 on. In May 1709, when attacked by the Iroquois on the Island, he sacrificed himself in order to let his travelling companions escape by running the Seven Chutes Rapids. Remaining alone on the Island, he died of his injuries and exhaustion. When found, he held in his hand a sheet of bark on which he had transcribed a death chant, known as La Complainte Cadieux. Its opening stanza is as follows:

Petit rocher de la haute montagne, (Little stone of the high mountain,)
Je viens ici finir cette campagne! (I come here to finish this campaign!)
Ah! doux échos, entendez mes soupirs (Ah! sweet echoes, hear my sighs)
En languissant, je vais bientôt mourir! (Languishing, soon will I die!)

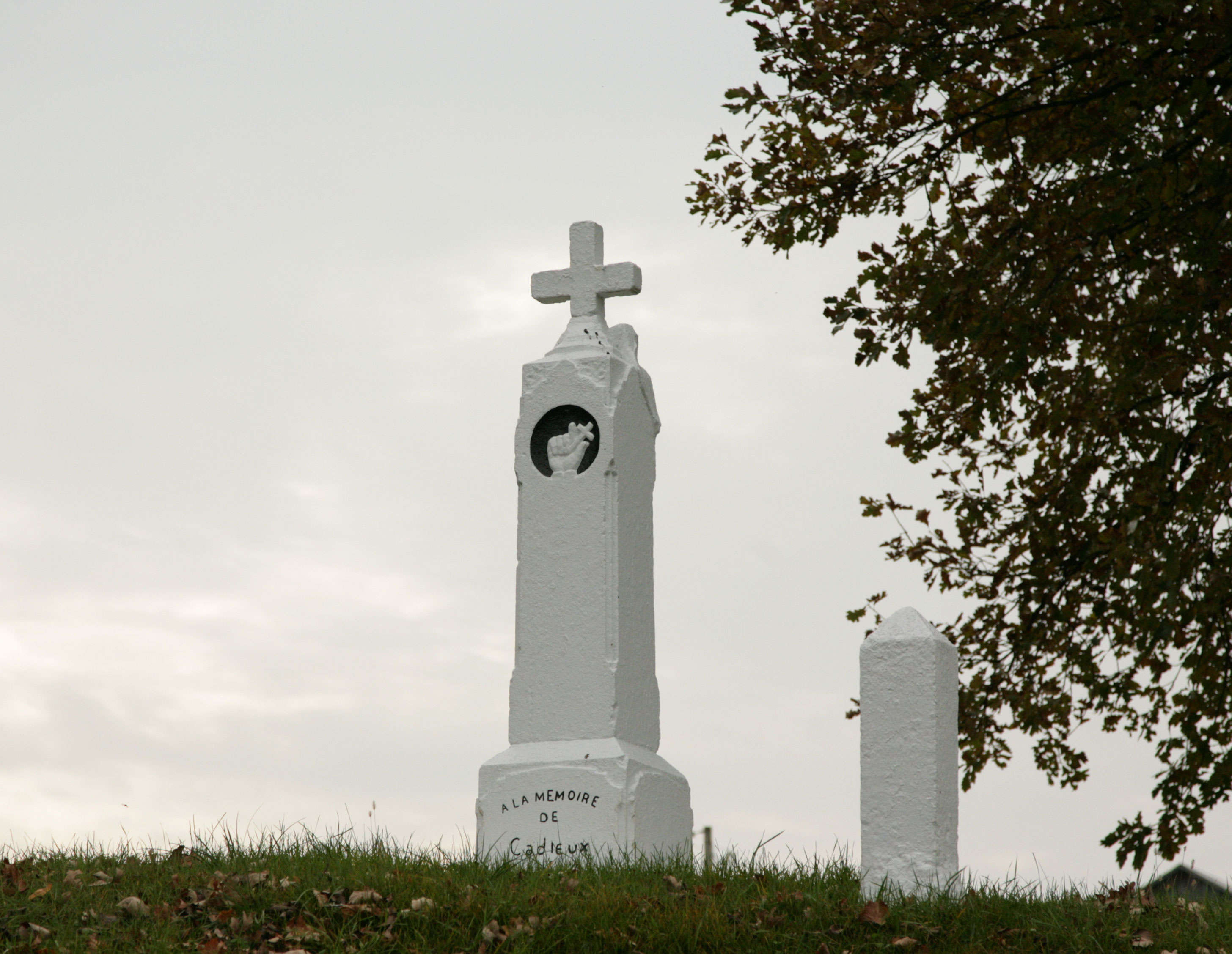
Memorial to Jean Cadieux

This legend is still kept alive and commemorated by the island's inhabitants.

Circa 1836, former employees of the Hudson's Bay Company started to settle on the island, followed by three waves of Irish immigration between 1840 and 1850. In 1840 the Parish of Sainte-Anne-du-Grand-Calumet was formed. In 1846 the Grand-Calumet Township was established, with F.X. Bastien as first mayor. On May 14, 1847, the Township Municipality of Calumet was created, but abolished on the next September 1 and reestablished in 1855.

Lead-zinc was discovered on Calumet Island in 1893. New Calumet Mines began production in 1943, with a peak output of 840 tons per day in 1953 and employing 435 people. In 1968 the mine was shut down.

In 2003, the Township Municipality of Grand-Calumet became the Municipality of Grand-Calumet, and on December 22, 2007, changed its name to the Municipality of L'Île-du-Grand-Calumet.

== Demographics ==
Canada census – L'Île-du-Grand-Calumet community profile

	2021	2016	2011
Population	648 (+3.5% from 2016)	626 (-14.4% from 2011)	731 (-6.9% from 2006)
Land area	130.55 km^{2} (50.41 sq mi)	132.57 km^{2} (51.19 sq mi)	132.14 km^{2} (51.02 sq mi)
Population density	5/km^{2} (13/sq mi)	4.7/km^{2} (12/sq mi)	5.5/km^{2} (14/sq mi)
Median age	56.8 (M: 56.8, F: 56.8)	56.8 (M: 56.4, F: 57.0)	52.2 (M: 52.0, F: 52.3)
Private dwellings	437 (total) 321 (occupied)	457 (total)	428 (total)
Median household income	$54,800	$46,784	$.N/A

Notes: 2011 income data for this area has been suppressed for data quality or confidentiality reasons.
References: 2021 2016 2011

Historical Census Data - L'Île-du-Grand-Calumet, Quebec

Year	Pop.	±%
1976	919	—
1981	872	−5.1%
1986	833	−4.5%
1991	787	−5.5%
1996	774	−1.7%

Year	Pop.	±%
2001	732	−5.4%
2006	785	+7.2%
2011	731	−6.9%
2016	626	−14.4%
2021	648	+3.5%

Source: Statistics Canada

=== Language ===
Mother tongue (2021):

- English as first language: 32.6%
- French as first language: 62.8%
- English and French as first language: 4.6%
- Other as first language: 0.8%

== List of mayors ==
Over its 158 years, the Municipality of L'Île-du-Grand-Calumet has had 21 mayors. They are as follows, including the years in which they served:

- François X. Bastien (1847-1866)
- Simon McNally (1894-1897)
- Cornelius McNally (1894-1897, 1901–1924, 1927–1928)
- François-Eugène LaSalle (1898-1900)
- Thomas Griffen (1925-1926, 1929–1930)
- Joseph Marchant (1931-1938)
- François X. Rouleau(1939-1941)
- Omer Dufault (1942-1949, 1954–1959)
- George Dufault (1950-1951)
- Pierre Corriveau (1951-1953)
- Gérald Lemaire (1960-1962)

- Alexandre Tremblay (1963-1965)
- Eugène Pigeon (1965-1973, 1977–1978)
- Marcel Pigeault (1974-1977, 1997–2001)
- Pierre Asselin (1978-1979)
- George Lamothe (1979-1980)
- Marcel Meloche (1981-1982)
- Lucien Brousseau (1983-1985)
- Gaétan Boulanger (1985-1987)
- Gisèle Benoît (1987-1995, 1995–1997)
- Paul-Emile Maleau (2001–2017)
- Serge Newberry (2017–2021)
- Jean-Louis Corriveau (2021–present)

== See also ==
- List of anglophone communities in Quebec
- List of municipalities in Quebec
