= Edmund Heath =

Canadian politician

Member of the Canadian Parliament for Pontiac
- In office 1867–1872
- Succeeded by: William McKay Wright

Personal details
- Born: September 13, 1813 Bristol, England
- Died: January 21, 1883 (aged 69) Clarendon, Quebec
- Party: Conservative

Edmund Heath (September 13, 1813 – January 21, 1883) was a Quebec lumber merchant and political figure. He was a Conservative member of the 1st Canadian Parliament representing Pontiac.

He was born in Bristol, England in 1813. He settled in Clarendon township in Lower Canada, where he entered the timber trade. Heath helped found the Bytown and Prescott Railway in 1853. In 1855, he was appointed Crown lands agent at Fort-Coulonge. He also served as major in the Pontiac county militia. He was elected to the 6th Parliament of the Province of Canada representing Pontiac in 1857; he was defeated in the election of 1861. In 1867, he was elected to the House of Commons.

He died at Clarendon in 1883.

1867 Canadian federal election: Pontiac
Party	Candidate	Votes
Conservative	Edmund Heath	acclaimed
Source: Canadian Elections Database
