= Chapeau, Quebec =

Village in Quebec, Canada

Coordinates: 45°54′46.7″N 77°4′30″W

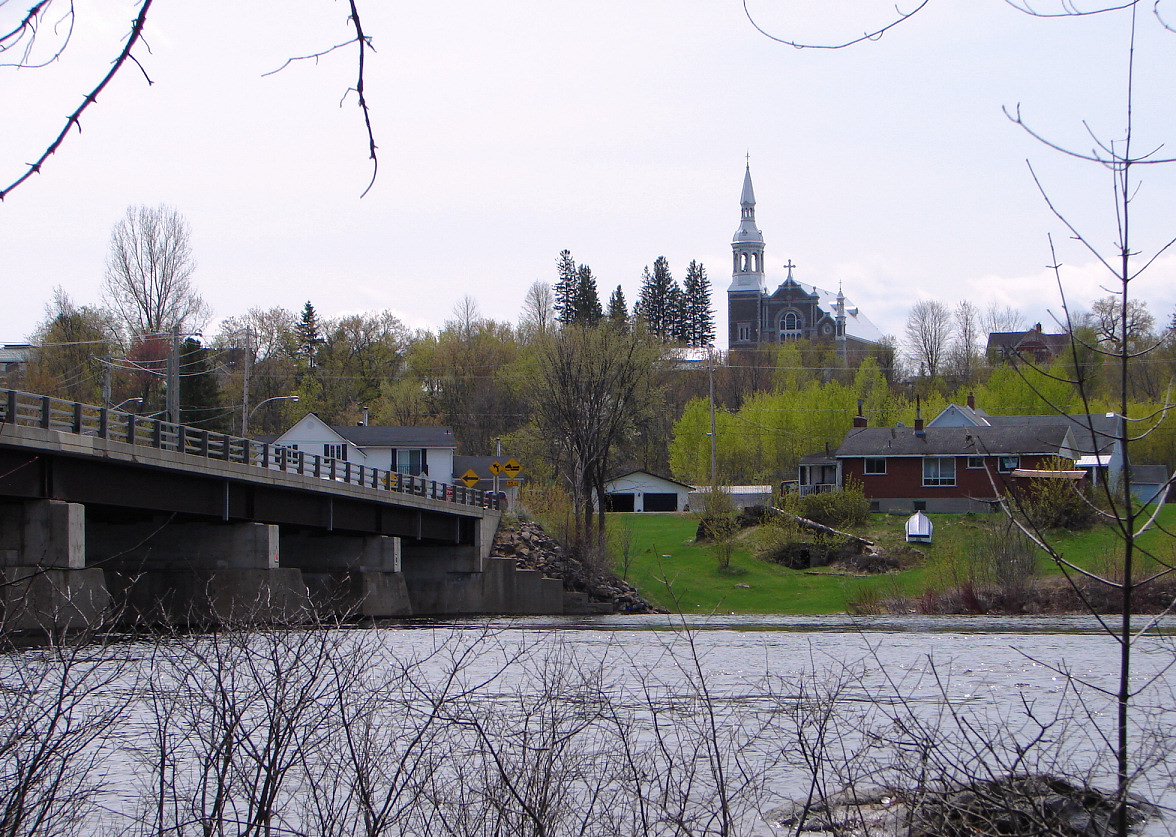
Chapeau

Chapeau (French pronunciation: [ʃapo]) is a village in the Canadian province of Quebec, located along the Culbute Channel of the Ottawa River in the municipality of L'Isle-aux-Allumettes in Pontiac Regional County Municipality.

There is speculation as to the real origin of the name "Chapeau" (French for "hat"). It has been hypothesized that geography of the village vaguely resembles the shape of a hat with three flat edges, or the name may come from a rock in the Ottawa River in the form of a French military headgear. According to other sources, Chapeau recalls a bizarre hairdo of a Native American chief. It may also come from the French surnames Chappeau and Chapeau, common in the time of New France. However, none of these explanations may be regarded as final.

== History ==
In 1874, the village of Chapeau separated from the Île-aux-Allumettes Township and became a municipality. On December 30, 1998, the municipality of Chapeau Village, together with the township municipalities of L'Isle-aux-Allumettes and L'Isle-aux-Allumettes-Partie-Est, were regrouped into the new Municipality of L'Isle-aux-Allumettes.

In 1883 the Chapeau hotel was built on Main Street by Agapit Maloney, which he owned and operated until 1918, when he died. Fred Meilleur bought the hotel in the 1940s, which became "Fred's Restaurant-Hotel".

On August 26, 2008, Fred's Restaurant-Hotel and an adjacent building were completely destroyed by an overnight fire. The restaurant-hotel was a local historic landmark, owned and operated by Fred Meilleur since the 1940s and was sold to a new owner, prior to the fire.

== Demographics ==
In the 2021 Census of Population conducted by Statistics Canada, Chapeau had a population of 325 living in 145 of its 168 total private dwellings, a change of -12.9% from its 2016 population of 373. With a land area of 5.75 km^{2} (2.22 sq mi), it had a population density of 56.5/km^{2} (146.4/sq mi) in 2021.

== Transportation ==
A bridge carries Chemin Pembroke over the Ottawa River and Rapide du Chapeau.

Starting on January 4, 2021, Transcollines has provided a public transit service from Chapeau to Gatineau via Québec Route 148 on bus line 910.
