= Pontiac—Kitigan Zibi =

Federal electoral district in Quebec, Canada

Coordinates: 46°20′N 76°50′W

Quebec electoral district
- Interactive map of riding boundaries from the 2025 federal election

Federal electoral district
- Legislature: House of Commons
MP
Sophie Chatel
Liberal
- District created: 1867
- First contested: 1867
- Last contested: 2025
- District webpage: profile, map

Demographics
- Population (2011): 106,499
- Electors (2015): 86,585
- Area (km²): 27,588.31
- Pop. density (per km²): 3.9
- Census division(s): Gatineau, La Vallée-de-la-Gatineau, Les Collines-de-l'Outaouais, Pontiac
- Census subdivision(s): Gatineau (part), Cantley, La Pêche, Chelsea, Pontiac, Maniwaki, Gracefield, Mansfield-et-Pontefract, Déléage, Shawville

Pontiac—Kitigan Zibi (formerly known as Pontiac) is a federal electoral district in western Quebec, Canada, that has been represented in the House of Commons of Canada from 1867 to 1949 and since 1968.

In every election since its creation except 1979 and 2011, Pontiac has been a bellwether electoral district whose electoral winner also was a member of the winning party.

== History ==
The electoral district existed over three distinct periods:

- It was created by the British North America Act 1867 which preserved existing electoral districts in Lower Canada. It was redistributed into the new electoral districts of Pontiac—Témiscamingue and Villeneuve in 1947.
- In 1966, an electoral district of Pontiac was created from Pontiac—Témiscamingue and parts of Gatineau and Labelle. Then, in 1978, it was renamed "Pontiac—Gatineau—Labelle".
- In 2003, the electoral district of Pontiac was created again during a redistribution of the ridings in western Quebec.

Pontiac lost territory to Argenteuil—La Petite-Nation and gained territory from Hull—Aylmer and Gatineau during the 2012 electoral redistribution.

Following the 2022 Canadian federal electoral redistribution, the riding was largely replaced by Pontiac—Kitigan Zibi. The new name refers to the reserve of Kitigan Zibi. It lost Val-des-Monts to Argenteuil—La Petite-Nation and that part of the City of Gatineau west of Montée Paiement to the riding of Gatineau, and gained the rest of the Plateau neighbourhood from Hull—Aylmer.

== Geography ==
The electoral district includes:

- the regional county municipality of Pontiac
- the Regional County Municipality of La Vallée-de-la-Gatineau, including Rapid Lake and Kitigan Zibi indian reserves
- that part of the City of Gatineau northwest of a line following Montée Paiment to Autoroute 50 to Boulevard la Vérendrye Ouest.
- that part of the City of Gatineau northwest of a line following Promenade de la Gatineau to Boulevard Saint-Raymond to Chemin Pink to Boulevard des Grives to Boulevard des Allumettières to Chemin Eardley
- the regional county municipality of Les Collines-de-l'Outaouais (excepting L'Ange-Gardien and Notre-Dame-de-la-Salette)

The neighbouring ridings are Abitibi—Témiscamingue, Abitibi—Baie-James—Nunavik—Eeyou, Saint-Maurice—Champlain, Laurentides—Labelle, Argenteuil—Papineau—Des Collines, Hull—Aylmer and Gatineau (in Quebec) and Kanata, Carleton, and Algonquin—Renfrew—Pembroke (in Ontario).

== Demographics ==
According to the 2021 Canadian census, 2023 representation

Racial groups:78.5% White, 8.4% Indigenous, 6.6% Black, 2.3% Arab, 1.3% Latin American
Languages: 65.8% French, 29.2% English, 1.6% Arabic, 1.3% Spanish
Religions: 63.6% Christian (48.8% Catholic, 1.7% Anglican, 1.6% United Church, 1.2% Christian Orthodox, 10.2% Other), 3.9% Muslim, 31.1% None
Median income: $47,200 (2020)
Average income: $56,550 (2020)

== Members of Parliament ==
This riding has elected the following members of Parliament:

Parliament	Years	Member	Party
Pontiac
1st	1867–1872	Edmund Heath	Conservative
2nd	1872–1874	William McKay Wright	Liberal–Conservative
3rd	1874–1878	William McKay Wright	Liberal–Conservative
4th	1878–1882	John Poupore	Conservative
5th	1882–1887	John Bryson	Conservative
6th	1887–1891	John Bryson	Conservative
7th	1891–1892	Thomas Murray	Liberal
7th	1892–1896	John Bryson	Conservative
8th	1896–1900	William Joseph Poupore	Conservative
9th	1900–1904	Thomas Murray	Liberal
10th	1904–1908	Gerald Hugh Brabazon	Conservative
11th	1908–1911	George Frederick Hodgins	Liberal
12th	1911–1917	Gerald Hugh Brabazon	Conservative
13th	1917–1921	Frank S. Cahill	Liberal
14th	1921–1925	Frank S. Cahill	Liberal
15th	1925–1926	Frank S. Cahill	Liberal
16th	1926–1930	Frank S. Cahill	Liberal
17th	1930–1935	Charles Bélec	Conservative
18th	1935–1940	Wallace McDonald	Liberal
19th	1940–1945	Wallace McDonald	Liberal
20th	1945–1946	Wallace McDonald	Liberal
20th	1946–1949	Réal Caouette	Social Credit
Riding dissolved into Pontiac—Témiscamingue and Villeneuve
Riding re-created from Pontiac—Témiscamingue, Gatineau and Labelle
28th	1968–1972	Thomas Lefebvre	Liberal
29th	1972–1974	Thomas Lefebvre	Liberal
30th	1974–1979	Thomas Lefebvre	Liberal
Pontiac—Gatineau—Labelle
31st	1979–1980	Thomas Lefebvre	Liberal
32nd	1980–1984	Thomas Lefebvre	Liberal
33rd	1984–1988	Barry Moore	Progressive Conservative
34th	1988–1993	Barry Moore	Progressive Conservative
35th	1993–1997	Robert Bertrand	Liberal
36th	1997–2000	Robert Bertrand	Liberal
37th	2000–2004	Robert Bertrand	Liberal
Pontiac
38th	2004–2006	David Smith	Liberal
39th	2006–2008	Lawrence Cannon	Conservative
40th	2008–2011	Lawrence Cannon	Conservative
41st	2011–2015	Mathieu Ravignat	New Democratic
42nd	2015–2019	Will Amos	Liberal
43rd	2019–2021	Will Amos	Liberal
44th	2021–2025	Sophie Chatel	Liberal
Pontiac—Kitigan Zibi
45th	2025–present	Sophie Chatel	Liberal

== Election results ==
Graph of election results in Pontiac (since 1968, minor parties that never got 2% of the vote or didn't run consistently are omitted) View source data.

=== Pontiac—Kitigan Zibi ===
2025 Canadian federal election
Party	Candidate	Votes	%	±%	Expenditures
Liberal	Sophie Chatel	32,088	54.60	+10.74	$75,068.00
Conservative	Brian Nolan	16,221	27.60	+6.20	$42,815.94
Bloc Québécois	Suzanne Proulx	6,071	10.33	–4.84	$3,322.26
New Democratic	Gilbert W. Whiteduck	2,971	5.06	–6.29	$18,780.08
Green	Claude Bertrand	749	1.27	–1.63	$4,435.17
People's	Todd Hoffman	673	1.15	–3.33	$7,588.87
Total valid votes		58,773	99.01	+0.17	$145,884.90
Total rejected ballots		587	0.99	–0.17	
Turnout		59,360	69.04	+3.55	
Eligible voters		85,977			
Liberal notional hold		Swing		+2.27	
Source: Elections Canada

2021 federal election redistributed results
Party	Vote	%
Liberal	23,154	43.86
Conservative	11,296	21.40
Bloc Québécois	8,011	15.17
New Democratic	5,990	11.35
People's	2,364	4.48
Green	1,531	2.90
Free	394	0.75
Canada's Fourth Front	44	0.08
Rhinoceros	7	0.01
Independent	2	0.00
Total valid votes	52,793	98.84
Rejected ballots	620	1.16
Registered voters/ estimated turnout	81,562	65.49

=== Pontiac, 2003–present ===
2021 Canadian federal election: Pontiac
Party	Candidate	Votes	%	±%	Expenditures
Liberal	Sophie Chatel	26,899	43.4	-5.5	$68,139.46
Conservative	Michel Gauthier	12,804	20.6	+3.8	$22,694.60
Bloc Québécois	Gabrielle Desjardins	10,424	16.8	+0.7	$2,148.28
New Democratic	Denise Giroux	6,824	11.0	+0.5	$10,297.98
People's	David Bruce Gottfred	2,813	4.5	+3.2	$5,129.74
Green	Shaughn McArthur	1,711	2.8	-3.3	$11,337.96
Free	Geneviève Labonté-Chartrand	480	0.8	N/A	$429.44
Canada's Fourth Front	James McNair	52	0.1	N/A	$0.00
Total valid votes/expense limit		62,007	98.9	–	$137,175.33
Total rejected ballots		723	1.1		
Turnout		62,730	65.6		
Eligible voters		95,563			
Liberal hold		Swing		-4.7	
Source: Elections Canada

2019 Canadian federal election: Pontiac
Party	Candidate	Votes	%	±%	Expenditures
Liberal	Will Amos	30,217	48.9	-5.64	$95,087.19
Conservative	Dave Blackburn	10,416	16.8	+2.87	$17,989.25
Bloc Québécois	Jonathan Carreiro-Benoit	9,929	16.1	+9.19	$2,059.60
New Democratic	Denise Giroux	6,503	10.5	-12.01	none listed
Green	Claude Bertrand	3,762	6.1	+4.36	none listed
People's	Mario Belec	775	1.3		$0.00
Veterans Coalition	Shawn Stewart	194	0.3		none listed
Marxist–Leninist	Louis Lang	51	0.1	-0.07	$0.00
Total valid votes/expense limit		61,847	100.0		
Total rejected ballots		661			
Turnout		62,508	68.2		
Eligible voters		91,656			
Liberal hold		Swing		-4.26	
Source: Elections Canada

2015 Canadian federal election: Pontiac
Party	Candidate	Votes	%	±%	Expenditures
Liberal	Will Amos	34,154	54.54	+39.35	$127,717.07
New Democratic	Mathieu Ravignat	14,095	22.51	-24.76	$47,758.81
Conservative	Benjamin Woodman	8,721	13.93	-12.26	$35,653.16
Bloc Québécois	Nicolas Lepage	4,327	6.91	-2.64	–
Green	Colin Griffiths	1,089	1.74	+0.11	$7,418.25
Strength in Democracy	Pascal Médieu	131	0.21	–	$379.41
Marxist–Leninist	Louis Lang	108	0.17	–	–
Total valid votes/expense limit		62,625	100.0		$254,590.45
Total rejected ballots		467	–	–	
Turnout		63,092	–	–	
Eligible voters		87,365			
Source: Elections Canada

2011 federal election redistributed results
Party	Vote	%
New Democratic	23,809	47.27
Conservative	13,189	26.19
Liberal	7,649	15.19
Bloc Québécois	4,810	9.55
Green	823	1.63
Others	87	0.17

2011 Canadian federal election: Pontiac
Party	Candidate	Votes	%	±%	Expenditures
New Democratic	Mathieu Ravignat	22,376	45.71	+30.28	
Conservative	Lawrence Cannon	14,441	29.50	-3.20	
Liberal	Cindy Duncan McMillan	6,242	12.75	-11.49	
Bloc Québécois	Maude Tremblay	4,917	10.05	-12.28	
Green	Louis-Philippe Mayrand	849	1.73	-3.28	
Marxist–Leninist	Benoit Legros	124	0.25	-0.01	
Total valid votes/expense limit		48,949	100.00		
Total rejected ballots		413	0.84	+0.13	
Turnout		49,362	60.00		
Eligible voters		82,308	–	–	

2008 Canadian federal election: Pontiac
Party	Candidate	Votes	%	±%	Expenditures
Conservative	Lawrence Cannon	14,023	32.70	-0.93	$79,996
Liberal	Cindy Duncan McMillan	10,396	24.24	+0.09	$20,896
Bloc Québécois	Marius Tremblay	9,576	22.33	-6.54	$47,435
New Democratic	Céline Brault	6,616	15.43	+5.47	$12,004
Green	André Sylvestre	2,148	5.01	+1.85	$12,545
Marxist–Leninist	Benoit Legros	112	0.26	+0.04	
Total valid votes/expense limit		42,871	100.00	$96,386	
Total rejected ballots		306	0.71		
Turnout		43,177			
Conservative hold		Swing		-0.51	

2006 Canadian federal election: Pontiac
Party	Candidate	Votes	%	±%	Expenditures
Conservative	Lawrence Cannon	16,067	33.63	+11.48	$71,020
Bloc Québécois	Christine Emond Lapointe	13,790	28.87	-0.32	$47,724
Liberal	David Smith	11,539	24.15	-14.21	$50,925
New Democratic	Celine Brault	4,759	9.96	+4.17	$23,543
Green	Moe Garahan	1,512	3.16	+2.84	$4,974
Marxist–Leninist	Benoit Legros	107	0.22	-0.11	
Total valid votes/expense limit		47,774	100.00	$89,728	
Conservative gain from Liberal		Swing		-12.8	

2004 Canadian federal election: Pontiac
Party	Candidate	Votes	%	±%	Expenditures
Liberal	David Smith	15,358	38.36	-7.03	$68,705
Bloc Québécois	L. Hubert Leduc	11,685	29.19	-2.89	$15,853
Conservative	Judith Grant	8,869	22.15	+3.70	$62,101
New Democratic	Gretchen Schwarz	2,317	5.79	+3.94	$2,580
Green	Thierry Vicente	1,673	4.18	+2.76	$1,213
Marxist–Leninist	Benoit Legros	132	0.33	+0.13	
Total valid votes/expense limit		40,034	100.00	$87,529	
Liberal hold		Swing	-2.07		

Note: Conservative vote is compared to the total of the Canadian Alliance vote and Progressive Conservative vote in 2000 election.

=== Pontiac—Gatineau—Labelle, 1979–2003 ===
2000 Canadian federal election: Pontiac—Gatineau—Labelle
Party	Candidate	Votes	%	±%
Liberal	Robert Bertrand	20,590	45.39	-0.39
Bloc Québécois	Johanne Deschamps	14,552	32.08	0.07
Alliance	Judith Grant	6,587	14.52	
Progressive Conservative	Benoit Larocque	1,784	3.93	-14.56
New Democratic	Melissa Hunter	836	1.84	-0.37
Green	Gretchen Schwarz	645	1.42	
Natural Law	Eleanor Hyodo	184	0.41	-0.56
Marxist–Leninist	Christian Legeais	92	0.20	
Independent	Thomas J. Sabourin	90	0.20	
Total valid votes		45,360	100.00	

1997 Canadian federal election: Pontiac—Gatineau—Labelle
Party	Candidate	Votes	%	±%
Liberal	Robert Bertrand	22,736	45.78	+5.71
Bloc Québécois	Robert Coulombe	15,897	32.01	-1.55
Progressive Conservative	Pierre Miller	9,187	18.50	-3.62
New Democratic	Brenda Lee	1,097	2.21	
Natural Law	Marc Lacroix	479	0.96	
Christian Heritage	Thomas Sabourin	269	0.54	
Total valid votes		49,665	100.00	

1993 Canadian federal election: Pontiac—Gatineau—Labelle
Party	Candidate	Votes	%	±%
Liberal	Robert Bertrand	17,377	40.07	+9.83
Bloc Québécois	Claude Radermaker	14,554	33.56	
Progressive Conservative	Barry Moore	9,593	22.12	-31.43
National	Brian Corriveau	755	1.74	
New Democratic	Nicole Des Roches	682	1.57	-14.63
Independent	Glen Emmett Patrick Kealey	402	0.93	
Total valid votes		43,363	100.00	

1988 Canadian federal election: Pontiac—Gatineau—Labelle
Party	Candidate	Votes	%	±%
Progressive Conservative	Barry Moore	20,522	53.56	-8.40
Liberal	Brian Murphy	11,589	30.24	+1.69
New Democratic	John Trent	6,207	16.20	+8.60
Total valid votes		38,318	100.00	

1984 Canadian federal election: Pontiac—Gatineau—Labelle
Party	Candidate	Votes	%	±%
Progressive Conservative	Barry Moore	21,754	61.96	+45.18
Liberal	Elizabeth Dickson	10,025	28.55	-41.84
New Democratic	Paul Rowland	2,667	7.60	-1.57
Parti nationaliste	Dominique Dealbuquerque	524	1.49	
Commonwealth of Canada	Donna Craig-Méthot	141	0.40	
Total valid votes		35,111	100.00	

1980 Canadian federal election: Pontiac—Gatineau—Labelle
Party	Candidate	Votes	%	±%
Liberal	Thomas Lefebvre	21,605	70.39	+6.62
Progressive Conservative	André Benoit	5,151	16.78	-1.64
New Democratic	Jean-Pierre Paillet	2,813	9.16	+3.87
Rhinoceros	Gaston Lagaffe Beauregard	643	2.09	+0.22
Union populaire	Vianney Lehouiller	306	1.00	+0.07
Marxist–Leninist	Alain Charette	176	0.57	
Total valid votes		30,694	100.00	
Source: Canadian Elections Database

1979 Canadian federal election: Pontiac—Gatineau—Labelle
Party	Candidate	Votes	%	±%
Liberal	Thomas Lefebvre	20,253	63.76	+8.09
Progressive Conservative	Sant Singh	5,851	18.42	-4.82
Social Credit	Rita Jones	3,084	9.71	-5.24
New Democratic	Ida Brown	1,682	5.30	-0.84
Rhinoceros	Gaston Beauregard	597	1.88	
Union populaire	Vianney Lehouiller	295	0.93	
Total valid votes		31,762	100.00	

=== Pontiac, 1968–1979 ===
1974 Canadian federal election: Pontiac
Party	Candidate	Votes	%	±%
Liberal	Thomas Lefebvre	12,642	55.67	+4.91
Progressive Conservative	Sant Singh	5,277	23.24	+6.03
Social Credit	Emmanuel Pétrin	3,394	14.95	-13.15
New Democratic	Raymond Carrier	1,394	6.14	+2.20
Total valid votes		22,707	100.00	

1972 Canadian federal election: Pontiac
Party	Candidate	Votes	%	±%
Liberal	Thomas Lefebvre	11,780	50.76	+1.70
Social Credit	L.-P. Larocque	6,519	28.09	+16.51
Progressive Conservative	Octave Vallée	3,993	17.21	-18.18
New Democratic	André Synnott	913	3.93	-0.02
Total valid votes		23,205	100.00	
Source: Canadian Elections Database

Note: Social Credit vote is compared to Ralliement créditiste vote in the 1968 election.

1968 Canadian federal election: Pontiac
Party	Candidate	Votes	%
Liberal	Thomas Lefebvre	10,250	49.07
Progressive Conservative	Paul Martineau	7,392	35.39
Ralliement créditiste	Louis-P. Larocque	2,420	11.59
New Democratic	James A. wood Shannon	827	3.96
Total valid votes		20,889	100.00

=== Pontiac, 1867–1948 ===
Canadian federal by-election, 16 September 1946: Pontiac
Party	Candidate	Votes	%	±%
On Mr. McDonald's death, 2 May 1946
Social Credit	Réal Caouette	11,412	35.86	+17.68
Liberal	Lucien Labelle	10,379	32.61	-8.77
Progressive Conservative	Hector-Émile Bélec	7,487	23.53	+4.47
Unknown	Bernard Molloy	1,975	6.21	
Unknown	Oscar Roy	572	1.80	
Total valid votes		31,825	100.00	

1945 Canadian federal election: Pontiac
Party	Candidate	Votes	%	±%
Liberal	Wallace McDonald	13,325	41.38	-2.24
Progressive Conservative	Thomas Edward McCool	6,136	19.06	
Social Credit	Réal Caouette	5,852	18.17	
Bloc populaire	Georges-Antoine Rioux	4,433	13.77	
Co-operative Commonwealth	Antoine E. Titley	2,453	7.62	
Total valid votes		32,199	100.00	

1940 Canadian federal election: Pontiac
Party	Candidate	Votes	%	±%
Liberal	Wallace McDonald	13,206	43.62	+12.36
Independent Liberal	Joseph-Édouard Piché	11,941	39.44	
National Government	Ernest Carrier	5,128	16.94	
Total valid votes		30,275	100.00	

1935 Canadian federal election: Pontiac
Party	Candidate	Votes	%	±%
Liberal	Wallace McDonald	5,708	31.26	
Liberal	Joseph-Édouard Piché	5,626	30.81	
Conservative	Joseph-Aurèle Raymond	4,409	24.14	-16.68
Reconstruction	Dieudonné Lapointe	2,519	13.79	
Total valid votes		18,262	100.00	

1930 Canadian federal election: Pontiac
Party	Candidate	Votes	%	±%
Conservative	Charles Bélec	8,884	40.82	+5.41
Independent Liberal	J.-Philippe Coté	6,988	32.11	
Liberal	Frank S. Cahill	5,891	27.07	-37.52
Total valid votes		21,763	100.00	

1926 Canadian federal election: Pontiac
Party	Candidate	Votes	%	±%
Liberal	Frank S. Cahill	11,166	64.59	+15.36
Conservative	Lucien-Alfred Ladouceur	6,121	35.41	+5.05
Total valid votes		17,287	100.0	

1925 Canadian federal election: Pontiac
Party	Candidate	Votes	%	±%
Liberal	Frank S. Cahill	7,562	49.23	-17.35
Conservative	Lucien Alfred Ladouceur	4,663	30.36	+7.52
Independent Liberal	Arthur Lepage	3,136	20.42	
Total valid votes		15,361	100.00	

1921 Canadian federal election: Pontiac
Party	Candidate	Votes	%	±%
Liberal	Frank S. Cahill	11,077	66.58	-10.92
Conservative	George Benjamin Campbell	3,800	22.84	+0.34
Progressive	George A. Landon	1,760	10.58	
Total valid votes		16,637	100.00	

Note: Conservative vote is compared to Government vote in 1917 election, and Liberal vote is compared to Opposition vote

1917 Canadian federal election: Pontiac
Party	Candidate	Votes	%	±%
Opposition (Laurier Liberals)	Frank S. Cahill	5,548	77.50	
Government (Unionist)	Joseph David Bastien	1,611	22.50	-22.08
Total valid votes		7,159	100.00	

1911 Canadian federal election: Pontiac
Party	Candidate	Votes	%	±%
Conservative	Gerald Hugh Brabazon	2,059	44.59	+3.15
Liberal	Frank S. Cahill	1,393	30.16	
Liberal	George Frederick Hodgins	1,166	25.25	-33.32
Total valid votes		4,618	100.00	

1908 Canadian federal election: Pontiac
Party	Candidate	Votes	%	±%
Liberal	George Frederick Hodgins	2,543	58.57	+9.78
Conservative	Gerald Hugh Brabazon	1,799	41.43	-9.78
Total valid votes		4,342	100.00	

1904 Canadian federal election: Pontiac
Party	Candidate	Votes	%	±%
Conservative	Gerald Hugh Brabazon	2,001	51.22	+3.87
Liberal	George Frederick Hodgins	1,906	48.78	-3.87
Total valid votes		3,907	100.00	

1900 Canadian federal election: Pontiac
Party	Candidate	Votes	%	±%
Liberal	Thomas Murray	1,798	52.65	+12.27
Conservative	Gerald Hugh Brabazon	1,617	47.35	-12.27
Total valid votes		3,415	100.00	

1896 Canadian federal election: Pontiac
Party	Candidate	Votes	%	±%
Conservative	W.J. Poupore	1,980	59.62	
Liberal	T.C. Gaboury	1,341	40.38	
Total valid votes		3,321	100.00	

By-election on 26 June 1892 On election being declared void, 9 May 1892
Party	Candidate	Votes
Conservative	John Bryson	??
Liberal	Thomas Murray	??

1891 Canadian federal election: Pontiac
Party	Candidate	Votes	%	±%
Liberal	Thomas Murray	1,100	41.01	+4.52
Unknown	H.M. McLean	795	29.64	
Conservative	John Bryson	787	29.34	-34.16
Total valid votes		2,682	100.00	

1887 Canadian federal election: Pontiac
Party	Candidate	Votes	%	±%
Conservative	John Bryson	1,681	63.51	+17.40
Liberal	Thomas Craig	966	36.49	
Total valid votes		2,647	100.00	

1882 Canadian federal election: Pontiac
Party	Candidate	Votes	%	±%
Conservative	John Bryson	1,047	46.10	-7.95
Unknown	N. McCuaig	931	41.00	
Unknown	W. Somerville	293	12.90	
Total valid votes		2,271	100.00	

1878 Canadian federal election: Pontiac
Party	Candidate	Votes	%
Conservative	John Poupore	1,381	54.05
Unknown	Thomas Murray	1,174	45.95
Total valid votes		2,555	100.00

1874 Canadian federal election: Pontiac
Party	Candidate	Votes
Liberal–Conservative	William McKay Wright	acclaimed
Source: Canadian Elections Database

1872 Canadian federal election: Pontiac
Party	Candidate	Votes	%
Liberal–Conservative	William McKay Wright	1,604	54.80
Unknown	Thomas Murray	1,323	45.20
Total valid votes		2,927	100.00
Source: Canadian Elections Database

1867 Canadian federal election: Pontiac
Party	Candidate	Votes
Conservative	Edmund Heath	acclaimed
Source: Canadian Elections Database

== See also ==
- List of Canadian electoral districts
- Historical federal electoral districts of Canada
