= Andy Oyler =

American baseball player (1880-1970)

- Infielder / Outfielder
- Born: May 5, 1880; Newville, Pennsylvania, U.S.
- Died: October 24, 1970 (aged 90); East Pennsboro Township, Pennsylvania, U.S.
- Batted: Right Threw: Right

MLB debut
- May 8, 1902, for the Baltimore Orioles

Last MLB appearance
- July 21, 1902, for the Baltimore Orioles

MLB statistics
- Batting average: .221
- Home runs: 1
- Runs batted in: 6
- Stats at Baseball Reference

Teams
- Baltimore Orioles (1902)

Andrew Paul "Pepper" Oyler (May 5, 1880 – October 24, 1970) was an American professional baseball player who played one season in Major League Baseball for the Baltimore Orioles in 1902. In 27 games as a third baseman, shortstop, and outfielder for the Orioles, he had 77 at-bats with 17 hits and one home run.

He was born in Newville, Pennsylvania and attended Washington & Jefferson College. He batted and threw right-handed. He was small in stature and was an excellent fielder, but not a good hitter. Even so, he was difficult to pitch to, since he would crouch "pretzel-like" in the batter's box to make his strike zone smaller. He died in East Pennsboro Township, Pennsylvania.

== Shortest home run in history ==
In 1953, sportswriter Jocko Maxwell published an article in Baseball Digest and item in Catholic Digest describing the shortest home run in baseball history. Maxwell described a baseball game where Oyler, as a shortstop for the Minneapolis Millers, was crouched in the batters' box in the bottom of the ninth inning and ducked to avoid a high pitch thrown at his head. The ball hit Oyler's bat, still resting on his shoulder, and became stuck in approximately 24 inches of mud in front of home plate. Oyler was then able to complete an inside-the-park home run before any opposing players were able to find the ball. Maxwell's article indicated the story was originally told by WWRL radio station in Woodside, New York. This story was repeated by sportswriter Bill Bryson Sr. in Baseball Digest in 1958. Another version of the story, as told by Halsey Hall, had Oyler chopping at a low pitch and sticking the ball into the mud 2 feet from home plate.

=== Controversy ===
Baseball historian Stew Thornley is skeptical of the story of Oyler's home run, pointing out there was no contemporary news report which described the incident. Other modern reference sources recount the story without caveat.

=== In popular culture ===
The story was the subject of a book of baseball lore by Michael G. Bryson called The Twenty-Four-Inch Home Run. It was also the inspiration for the children's book, Mudball by Matt Tavares, which won the 2005 Parents' Choice Awards Gold Award. In the "Author's Note" Tavares describes the story of Oyler's home run as being folklore*.

==== Antiques Roadshow ====
Oyler's grandson appeared on Antiques Roadshow on January 20, 2020. He brought his grandfather's ball from that game to which his grandfather had attached a postage stamp and mailed to his grandmother. A vestige of the stamp was still stuck to the ball. Oyler followed up with a letter to his wife that recounted the entire game and the fact that he had made a 24-inch home run. The grandson said he still had the letter although that is not the case. The ball's value was assessed at $3,000 to $5,000.

== See also ==
- The Twenty-Four-Inch Home Run
