= Dominique Bouhours =

French literary critic

Dominique Bouhours SJ (15 May 1628 – 27 May 1702) was a French Jesuit priest, essayist, grammarian, and neo-classical critic. He was born and died in Paris.

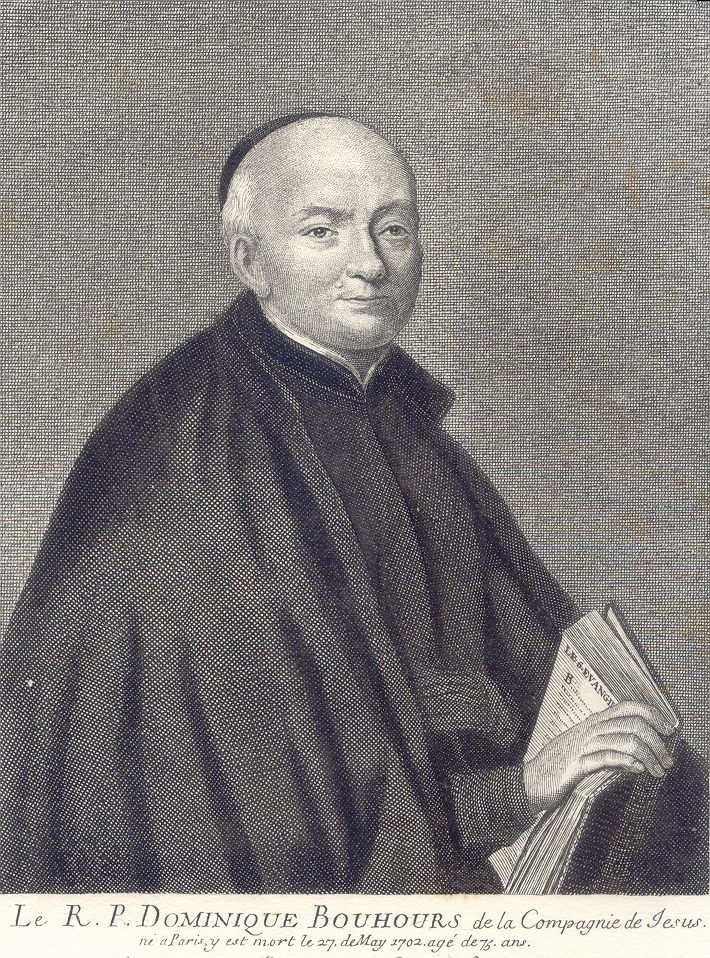
Dominique Bouhours

== Life ==
Bouhours entered the Society of Jesus at the age of sixteen, and was appointed to read lectures on literature in the Collège de Clermont at Paris, and on rhetoric at Tours and Rouen. He afterwards became private tutor to the two sons of Henri II d'Orléans, duc de Longueville.

He was sent to Dunkirk to minister to Catholic refugees from the Commonwealth of England, and in the midst of his missionary occupations published several books. In 1665 or 1666 he returned to Paris.

Bouhours died at Paris in 1702. According to the book Mother Tongue by Bill Bryson, Bouhours' dying words were "I am about to—or I am going to—die: either expression is used."

== Works ==
In 1671, Bouhours published Les Entretiens d'Ariste et d'Eugène, which was reprinted four more times at Paris, twice at Grenoble, and afterwards at Lyon, Brussels, Amsterdam, Leiden and other cities. The work consists of six conversations (entretiens) between two companionable friends whose Greek- and Latin-derived names both mean "well-born", in the agreeable discursive manner of the well-informed amateur as it had become established in the salons—"the free and familiar conversations that well-bred people have (honnêtes gens, a by-word of the précieuses of the salons) when they are friends, and which do not fail to be witty, and even knowledgeable, though one never dreams there of making wit show, and study has no part in it." The subjects, erudite but devoid of pedantry, are the Sea, considered as an object of contemplation, the French language, Secrets, True Wit ("Le Bel Esprit"), The Ineffable ("Le Je ne sais quoi") and Mottoes ("Devises"), all expressed in flawless idiom and effortless allusions to the Classics or Torquato Tasso. The popularity of Bouhours' discursive, heuristic Entretiens extended to Poland, where Stanisław Herakliusz Lubomirski imitated them in Dialogues of Artakses and Ewander.

His thoughts on the elusive je ne sais quoi that was in vogue in the seventeenth century, expressed through his characters, ends in assessing it a mystery that escapes a rational inquiry. It determined by its delicate presence, its grace and invisible charm, the sense of what pleases or displeases in Nature as well as Art, and remained an essential part of the French critical vocabulary until the advent of Romanticism.

His Doutes sur la langue française proposés aux Messieurs de l'Académie française (Paris, 1674; corrected second edition, 1675) was called "the most important and best organized of his numerous commentaries on the literary language of his time" when it was edited in a critical edition. His doubts are collected under five headings: vocabulary, phrases and collocations, grammatical constructions, clarity, and stylistic consistency, in each case setting literary quotations under scrutiny. His standards, expressed in the suggestions he offered for improving each example, showed the way out of ambiguities, skirting incongruous juxtapositions and untidy constructions. The work was widely accepted and Bouhours standards are still the accepted norm among literate readers today.

The chief of his other works are La Manière de bien penser sur les ouvrages d'esprit (1687), which appeared in London in 1705 under the title, The Art of Criticism, Vie de Saint Ignace de Loyola (1679), Vie de Saint François Xavier (1682), and a translation of the New Testament into French (1697). His letters against the Jansenists had a wide circulation. His practice of publishing secular books and works of devotion alternately led to the mot, qu'il servait le monde et le ciel par semestre.

== Bibliography ==
- Smith, Gerard, ed. (1939). Jesuit thinkers of the Renaissance. Milwaukee (USA). pp. 63–74.
