= Down Under (book) =

Book by Bill Bryson

- First edition design
- Author: Bill Bryson
- Illustrator: Neil Gower
- Cover artist: David Cook
- Language: English
- Subject: Australia
- Genre: Travel
- Publisher: Doubleday
- Publication date: 2000
- Publication place: Great Britain
- Media type: Print
- Pages: 319
- ISBN: 0-552-99703-X
- OCLC: 46662535
- Preceded by: Notes from a Big Country
- Followed by: Bill Bryson's African Diary

Down Under is the British title of a 2000 travelogue book about Australia written by best-selling travel writer Bill Bryson. In the United States and Canada it was published titled In a Sunburned Country, a title taken from the famous Australian poem, "My Country". It was also published as part of Walk About, which included Down Under and another of Bryson's books, A Walk in the Woods: Rediscovering America on the Appalachian Trail, in one volume.

== Summary ==
Bill Bryson describes his travels by railway and car throughout Australia, his conversations with people in all walks of life about the history, geography, unusual plants and animals of the country, and his wry impressions of the life, culture and amenities (or lack thereof) in each locality.

In a style similar to his book A Walk in the Woods, or William Least Heat-Moon's Blue Highways, Bryson's research enabled him to include many stories about Australia's 19th-century explorers and settlers who suffered extreme deprivations, as well as details about its natural resources, culture, and economy. His writings are intertwined with recurring humorous themes.

== Synopsis ==
The book consists of three parts:

1. Into the Outback

The first part of the book mainly describes the journey taken by Bryson aboard the Indian Pacific from Sydney to Perth. He is accompanied on this journey by a young English photographer named Trevor Ray Hart. The author describes his experiences on the train, the places the train passes through on its way to Perth such as the Blue Mountains and White Cliffs. The author also supplies plenty of humor in the form of historical accounts of early explorers and settlers of Australia.

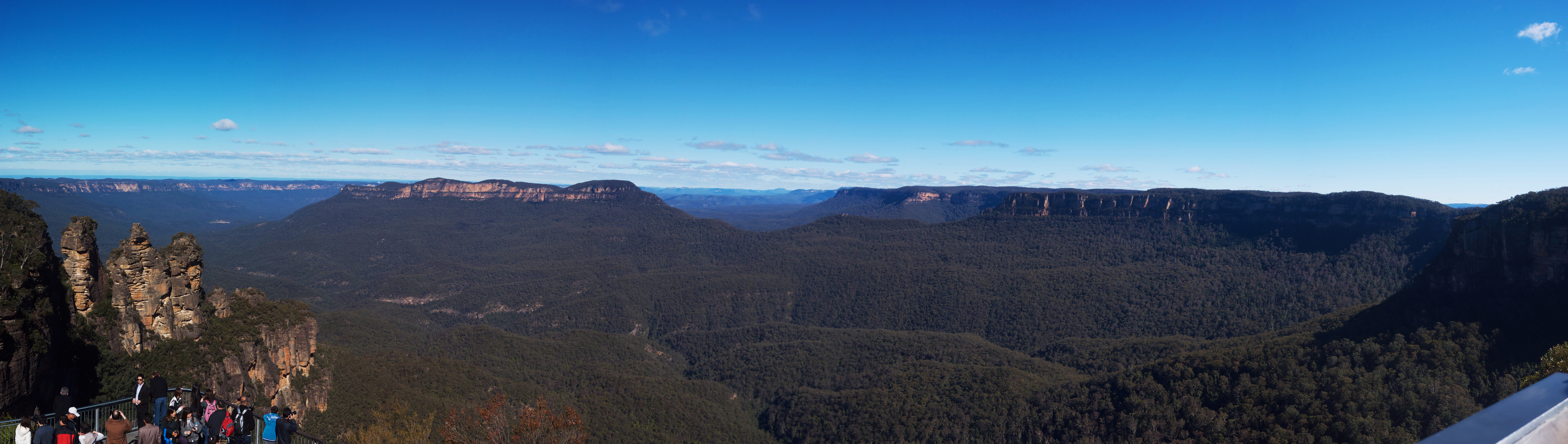
View of Jamison Valley from north escarpment, outside Katoomba: Three Sisters far left; Mount Solitary left of centre; Narrowneck Plateau, far right, all part of the Blue Mountains region

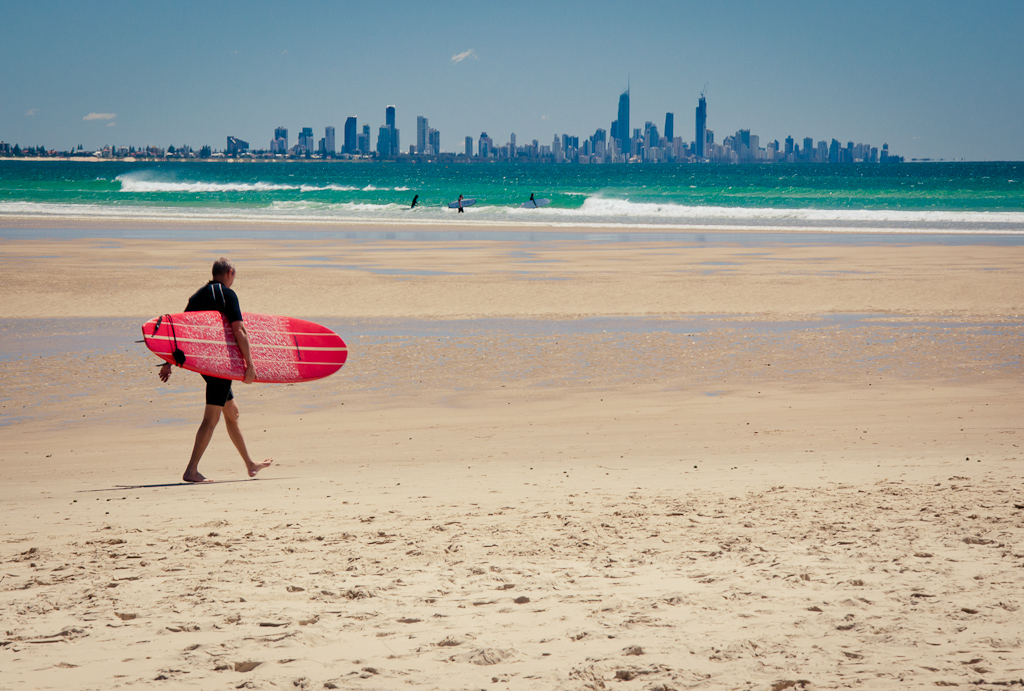
Surfers Paradise as seen from Currumbin Beach

2. Civilized Australia (The Boomerang Coast)

This section of the book starts off with historical accounts from the time when Australia was discovered and goes on to illustrate how the Australians built a dynamic and prosperous society from a modest and unpropitious beginning. The rest of this section is devoted to the author's account of what he considers to be Civilized Australia, with accounts of Sydney, Melbourne, Adelaide, Canberra, the Gold Coast, Surfers Paradise, and many countryside towns in between.

3. Around the Edges

This part of the journey covers the Great Barrier Reef, the cities of Cairns, Darwin, and Alice Springs, and the mighty monolithic rock Uluru. Later Bryson visits Perth and the Shark Bay area of Western Australia.

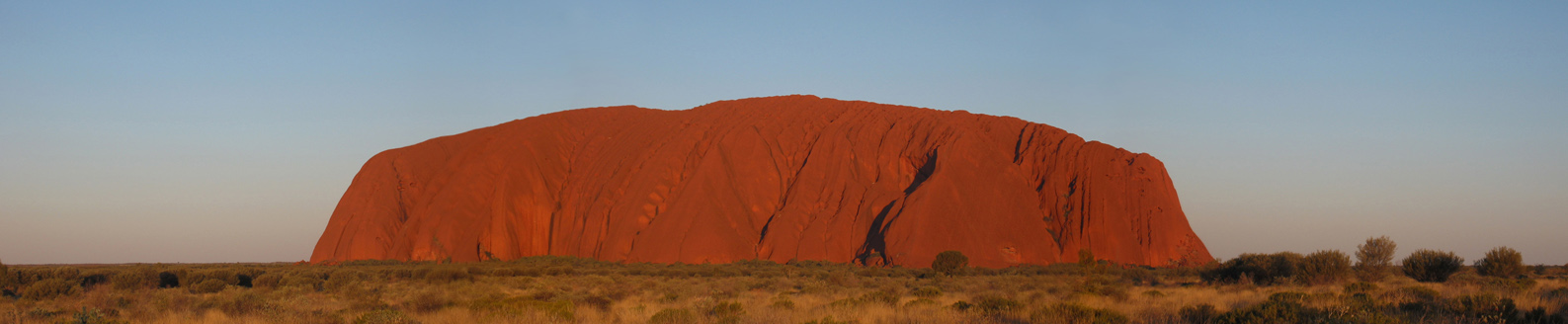
A panorama of Uluru around sunset, showing its distinctive red colouration at dusk.

== Notes ==
- The Guardian newspaper reprinted the first chapter of the book
