= One Summer: America, 1927 =

2013 history book by Bill Bryson

- First edition
- Author: Bill Bryson
- Genre: History, non-fiction
- Publisher: Doubleday
- Publication date: October 2013
- Publication place: United Kingdom
- Media type: Hardcover, paperback, e-book
- Pages: 528
- ISBN: 978-0767919401
- OCLC: 841198242

One Summer: America, 1927 is a 2013 history book by Bill Bryson. The book is a history of the summer of 1927 in the United States. It was published in October 2013 by Doubleday. The book focuses on various key events of that summer as lenses through which to view American life: what it had recently been and what it was becoming.

The events covered include the nonstop transatlantic flight of Charles Lindbergh; the Great Mississippi Flood of 1927; the unusual season played by Babe Ruth and the rest of the 1927 New York Yankees; the transition from the Ford Model T to the new Model A; the execution of Sacco and Vanzetti; the Jess Willard vs Jack Dempsey boxing match; the presidency of Calvin Coolidge; and the advent of the talking-picture era with the release of The Jazz Singer.

One of the themes explored is the contrast between the Roaring Twenties of the time, and the looming Great Depression. For example, the rapid rise and equally rapid fall of the business empire of the Van Sweringen brothers is discussed, with its glimpses of future suburbia (at Shaker Heights, Ohio) and future shopping malls (at Union Terminal), as well as the brothers' eventual death in poverty. Also briefly discussed is the rise and fall of Charles Ponzi's postal coupon business, the original Ponzi scheme. The primary focus of the book, however, is on daily life, and popular culture during that summer, such as daredevil flying, the party life of sports stars, the habits of eccentric geniuses, and what people did during hot times when air conditioning was unknown except as a scarce luxury at a few theaters and hotels.

The focus on a particular moment in history as a means to explore the wider world parallels Bryson's previous book, 2010's At Home: A Short History of Private Life, which used a particular place on Earth (a parson's house in England) as a home base from which to explore a broader subject. Both books note a singular coalescence of coincidences or turning points in a particular year (At Home, 1851; One Summer, 1927).

These location-centered and timepoint-centered approaches offer a contrast to 2003's A Short History of Nearly Everything, which used a diametrically opposite approach, sweeping widely across time, distance, and scale. All of the books share the common theme that they help the reader to understand life and the universe as integrated wholes and yet simultaneously as variegated collections of details.

Bryson does not address himself solely to American readers. For example, Babe Ruth and baseball are a major topic of the book, and Bryson gives useful explanations of this American game and its terminology.
