= Middle America (United States) =

Colloquial term for the US heartland

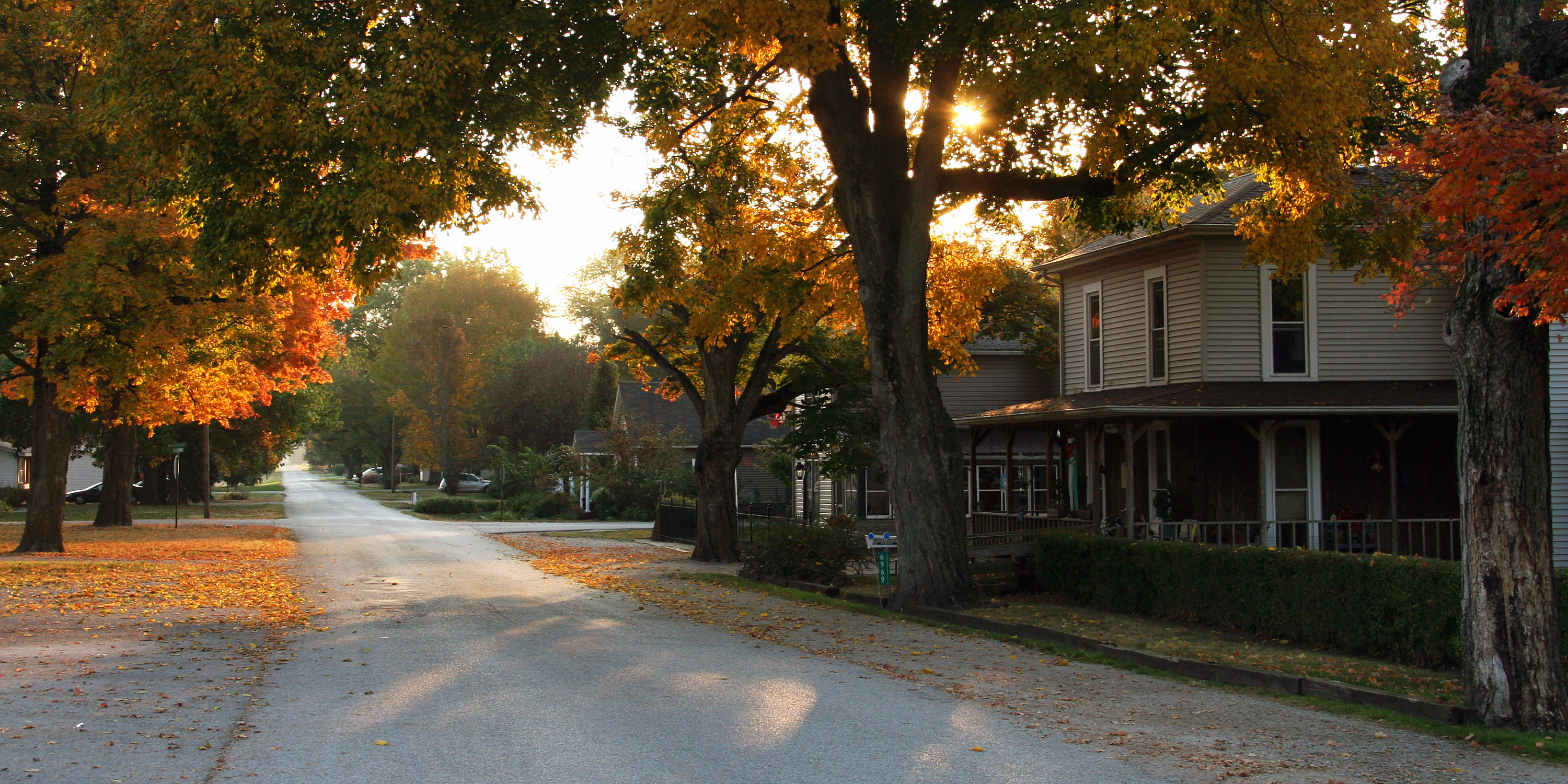
A street in West Point, Indiana, in October 2010; an example of somewhere that is considered to be in the region of Middle America

Middle America is a colloquial term for the United States heartland, especially the culturally suburban areas of the United States, typically the lower Midwestern region of the country, which consists of Ohio, Indiana, Iowa, Nebraska, Kansas, Missouri, and downstate Illinois.

Middle America is generally used as both a geographic and cultural label, suggesting a central United States small town or suburb where most people are middle class or upper middle class, religiously Evangelical, Mainline Protestant, or non-denominational Christian, and typically, but not always, European Americans, particularly of Anglo-Saxon Protestant or other Germanic descent.

== As a geographical label ==
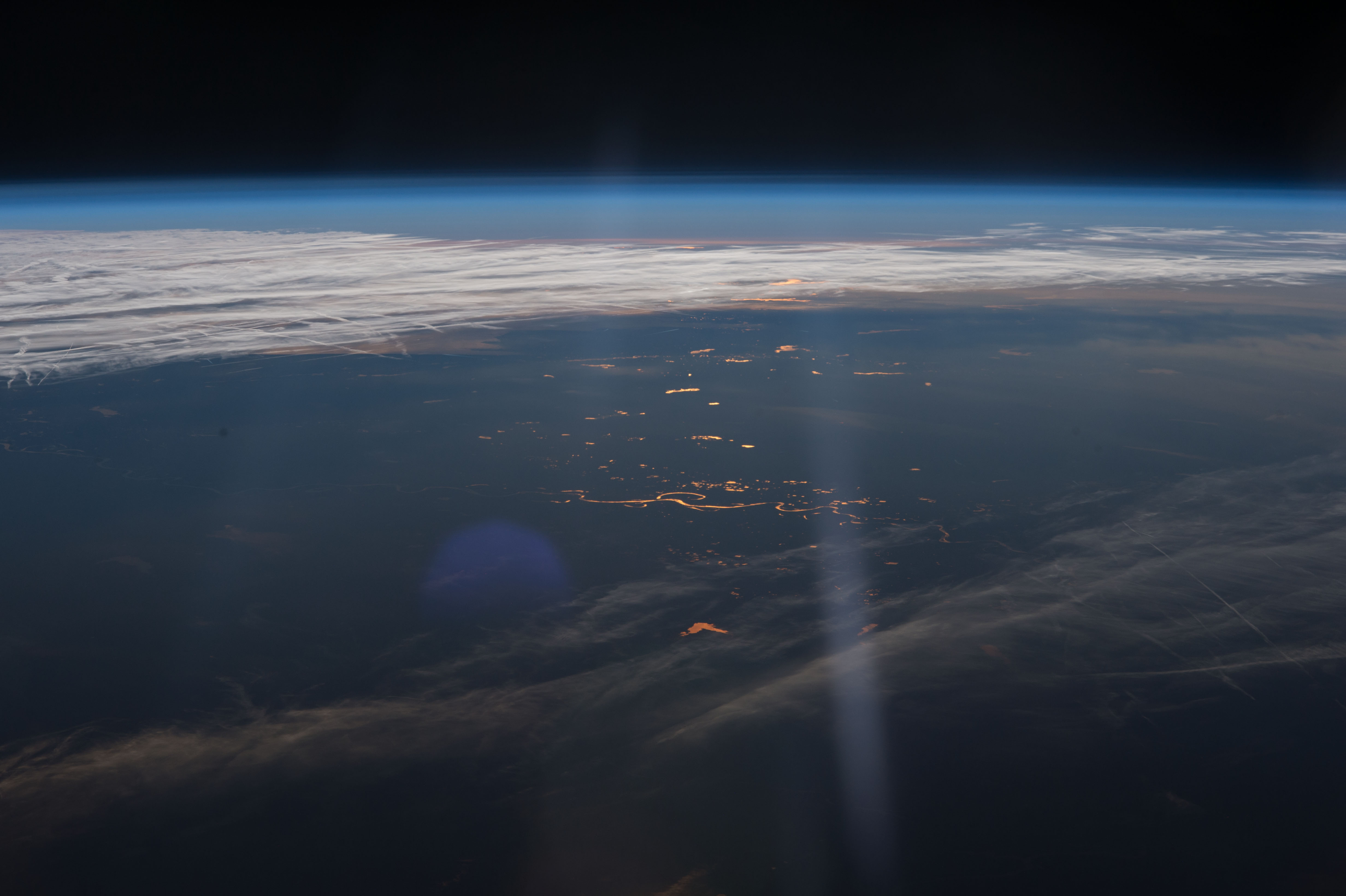
A photo taken on the International Space Station by Terry W. Virts captioned "Looking back over middle America at twilight"

Geographically, the label Middle America refers to the territory between the East Coast of the United States (particularly the northeast) and the West Coast. The term has been used in some cases to refer to the inland portions of coastal states, especially if they are rural. Alternately, the term is used to describe the central United States.

== As a cultural label ==
Middle America is contrasted with the more culturally progressive, urban areas of the country, particularly, those of the East and West Coasts. The conservative values considered typical of Middle America (often called "family values" in American politics) are often called "Middle American values".

The plots of such American films as Sweet Home Alabama and The Judge center on the contrast between big city life and that of a typical "Middle America" small town; in both, a protagonist with a successful big city career is drawn back to an old hometown. Similarly, the protagonist of John Grisham's novel The Associate leaves a well-paid job at a giant Wall Street law firm and goes to work with his lawyer father in his hometown, York, Pennsylvania. The contrast between "Middle America" and big city America is evident in the life of the fictional superhero Superman – growing up as Superboy in the archetypal Smallville and as an adult moving to the equally archetypal Metropolis. The depiction of Ron Kovic's childhood in the early parts of Born on the Fourth of July also fits the cultural perceptions of "Middle America" (though Kovic's hometown, Massapequa, is physically located on Long Island). The same applies to the episode of Ayn Rand's novel The Fountainhead which is set in Clayton, Ohio and which depicts that town as the archetype of "Middle America", the polar opposite of the cosmopolitan New York City where most of the novel's plot takes place.

Recently, there has been a diversification in the demographics traditionally attributed to Middle America. Individuals and families of various ethnic backgrounds, including Asians and Hispanics, have started to reside in small towns in various interior states, including, but not limited to, Oklahoma, Kansas, Missouri, and Ohio.

== Economy ==
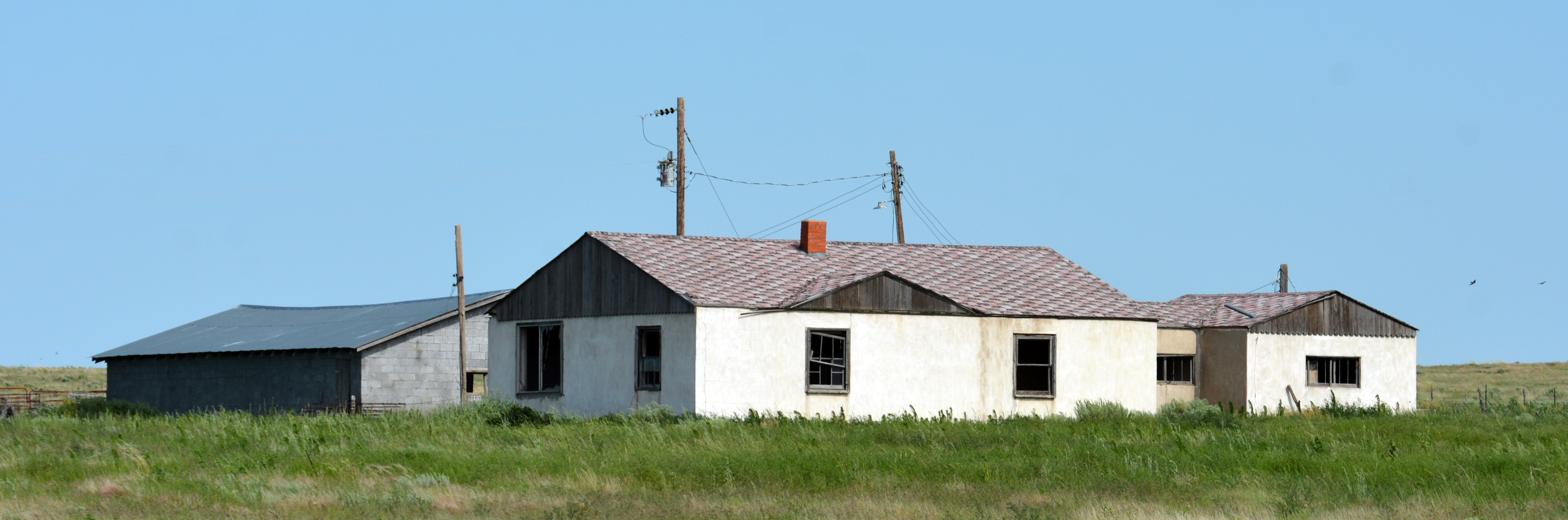
An abandoned American farm, June 2015

Historically, the economy of Middle America has been supported by agricultural worker and industry labor. Housing prices tend to be significantly less volatile than those on the coasts, and houses tend to appreciate in value more slowly, the late 2000s mortgage crisis notwithstanding.

== Politics ==
The phrase Middle American values is a political cliché; like family values, it refers to more traditional or conservative politics. However, across the United States and more recently in the South, metropolitan areas and major university towns tend to be politically and socially progressive. Examples of such metropolitan areas include Kansas City, Missouri; Columbus, Ohio; Indianapolis, Indiana; Cincinnati, Ohio; and Minneapolis, Minnesota, and major university towns include Madison, Wisconsin; Champaign, Illinois; Bloomington, Indiana; Carbondale, Illinois; Lawrence, Kansas; Athens, Ohio; and Ann Arbor, Michigan. Reflecting these countervailing trends, many political battleground states are situated in "Middle America."

Despite likely being an apocryphal story, President Lyndon Johnson has been widely attributed as stating "[i]f I've lost Cronkite, I've lost Middle America," after viewing a CBS Evening News report by Walter Cronkite critical of U.S. prospects in the Vietnam War in February 1968. The quote is often cited in relation to Johnson's subsequent change of heart a month later in declining to seek re-election in 1968.

== See also ==
- Americas (terminology)
- Deep England
- Heartland (United States)
- The Lost Continent: Travels in Small-Town America
- Heartland rock
- Middle Australia
- Middle England
- Red states and blue states
