= Sue Clifford =

Susan Merlyn Clifford MBE (born 16 April 1944) co-founded Common Ground, a British organisation which campaigns to link nature with culture and the positive investment people can make in their own localities, with Angela King in 1983.

She has worked as a planner and as a lecturer in environmental planning, latterly at University College London. With King, she has written and edited a variety of books to help people be more expressive about and be more active within their own locality. She is co-author of England in Particular ‘a celebration of the commonplace, the local, the vernacular and the distinctive’.

Sue debated the future of the English countryside with Bill Bryson, Richard Mabey, Richard Girling and Nicholas Crane at CPRE's 2007 Volunteers' Conference.

== Books ==
- Trees Rivers and Fields (2001)
- England in Particular (2006)
- The Apple Source Book (2007)
- Community Orchards Handbook (2011)
