= Bill Bryson's African Diary =

2002 book by Bill Bryson

- Cover of 2002 Doubleday hardback edition
- Author: Bill Bryson
- Illustrator: Neil Gower
- Subject: Kenya
- Genre: Travel
- Publisher: Doubleday
- Publication date: 2002
- Pages: 63
- ISBN: 0-7679-1506-2
- Preceded by: Down Under
- Followed by: A Short History of Nearly Everything

Bill Bryson's African Diary is a 2002 book by bestselling travel writer Bill Bryson. In this book, Bryson recounts his trip to Kenya in 2002, sharing his experiences and observations about Kenyan culture, geography, and politics. He also discusses his visits to poverty-fighting projects run by CARE International, to which he donated all royalties from the book.

== Reception ==
In a review published in the Guardian, Lionel Shriver criticized the book's length, describing it as "less a book than a pamphlet." Shriver also disliked the book's tone: "a po-faced, gee-whizz sincerity ill-suited to a writer who has made his reputation for being light and wry (and even snide) in droll travel books."
