= The Road to Little Dribbling =

Non-fiction book by Bill Bryson

The Road to Little Dribbling: More Notes from a Small Island
- Front cover of the European paperback edition.
- Author: Bill Bryson
- Language: English
- Genre: Travel, non-fiction
- Publisher: Doubleday
- Publication date: 8 October 2015
- Publication place: United Kingdom
- Media type: Hardcover, ebook
- Pages: 400
- ISBN: 0857522345
- OCLC: 908517220
- Preceded by: Notes From a Small Island

The Road to Little Dribbling: More Notes from a Small Island is a humorous travel book by American author Bill Bryson, first published in 2015.

Twenty years after the publication of Notes from a Small Island (1995), Bryson makes another journey around Great Britain to see what has changed. In the opening chapters he notes that the straight line distance from Bognor Regis on the south coast to Cape Wrath in Scotland is the longest straight line one can travel in the UK without crossing any part of the sea. He dubs this the "Bryson Line" and uses it as a rough basis for the route he travels in the book, concentrating mainly on places that he did not visit in Notes from a Small Island.

The U.K. cover depicts The Jolly Fisherman of Skegness, skipping with the Seven Sisters in the background. Both of these are iconic images of British sea-side culture and landscape, although geographically distant from one another.
