= The Twenty-Four-Inch Home Run =

1990 book by Michael G. Bryson

The Twenty-Four-Inch Home Run: And Other Outlandish, Incredible But True Events in Baseball History
- Author: Michael G. Bryson
- Language: English
- Subject: Baseball
- Genre: Non-fiction
- Publisher: Contemporary Books
- Publication date: 1990
- Pages: 293
- ISBN: 978-0-8092-4341-9

The Twenty-Four-Inch Home Run: And Other Outlandish, Incredible But True Events in Baseball History is a book about baseball lore written by sportswriter Michael G. Bryson. The title refers to the book's central story, about a game during which Andy Oyler hit a baseball that became stuck in the mud 24 inches in front of home plate, allowing him to score an inside-the-park home run before the opposing team located it. All told, the book contains 250 such stories, including an anecdote about a team registering a triple play without touching the ball. Bryson also debunks several well-known baseball legends, including Babe Ruth's called shot and the story that Abner Doubleday invented baseball.

The News Journal described the book as being filled with "wisecrack anecdotes" and "amazing facts, ludicrous turns of events, and hilarious quotes." Baseball historian Stew Thornley described the book as "compilation of strange but supposedly true baseball tales", but questioned the veracity of the Oyler story, saying that Bryson "provides more details and great embellishment but did not give the date of the game."

The book has been cited as a source by Society for American Baseball Research, several reference books, and a book about baseball's influence on American foreign policy. One review wryly quipped "The title explains this book about as well as any brief review could."

It was used as a source for Matt Tavares's children's book Mudball. The book was featured by the LA84 Foundation in its 1991 convention.
