= Neither Here nor There =

Neither Here nor There may refer to:

- Neither Here nor There (book), an artbook and album by the American band The Melvins
- Neither Here nor There: Travels in Europe, a travelogue by Bill Bryson
- Neither Here nor There (radio programme), a 2007 BBC Radio 2 programme about Chic Murray
- "Neither Here nor There" (Fringe), the fourth-season premiere of the television series Fringe
