= A Walk in the Woods (film) =

2015 film by Ken Kwapis

- Theatrical release poster
- Directed by: Ken Kwapis
- Screenplay by: Rick Kerb; Bill Holderman
- Based on: A Walk in the Woods by Bill Bryson
- Produced by: Robert Redford; Bill Holderman; Chip Diggins
- Starring: Robert Redford; Nick Nolte; Emma Thompson
- Cinematography: John Bailey
- Edited by: Carol Littleton; Julie Garces
- Music by: Nathan Larson
- Production companies: Route One Films; Wildwood Enterprises
- Distributed by: Broad Green Pictures
- Release dates: January 23, 2015 (Sundance); September 2, 2015 (United States)
- Running time: 104 minutes
- Country: United States
- Language: English
- Budget: $8 million
- Box office: $37.7 million

A Walk in the Woods is a 2015 American biographical comedy-drama film directed by Ken Kwapis and starring Robert Redford, Nick Nolte and Emma Thompson. Based on the 1998 book of the same name by Bill Bryson, it tells the story of the author's attempt to walk the length of the Appalachian Trail with an old friend later in life.

The film was released on September 2, 2015, by Broad Green Pictures, to mixed critical reviews.

== Plot ==
In a television interview a condescending reporter grills travel guide author Bill Bryson about his published, but dated, popular travel guides and asks if he will be writing more. Bryson, now in his 60s, has not published much since moving back to the US for twenty years. He is unable to give the reporter a satisfactory justification for his reluctance to write a guide for North America and was dissatisfied with this interview.

Bryson and his wife Catherine attend the funeral of a friend. Afterwards, Bryson – now in an apparent internal conflict about his age – takes a stroll and comes across a nearby Appalachian Trail marker that catches his interest. After some research, he decides that he wants to hike the length of the trail. Catherine strongly objects, pointing to accounts of accidents and murders on the trail. She only relents when Bryson promises not to hike the trail alone.

Bryson searches for a friend willing to join him. Everyone declines his invitation with some declaring him insane for undertaking such a risky journey at his age. Finally, Bryson is contacted by Stephen Katz, an old friend (and recovering alcoholic) who offers to be a hiking companion. He is out of shape and addicted to junk food but claims to be fit enough for the challenge. Bryson's wife is unhappy with his choice, but relents when it becomes clear that nobody else is willing to accompany her husband.

Within less than a mile of their departure point, as groups of younger hikers easily overtake them, they begin to grasp the difficulty of their ambition; they are on the verge of turning back when a group of young children effortlessly runs by them up the trail. Seeing others pass by so easily motivates them to carry on. Weeks pass; during an argument over a bottle of alcohol Bill found in Katz's pack, Katz bitterly reveals that he does not drink from it – he carries it as tangible reminder of his past battles with alcoholism and the losses it caused (specifically, his relationships with his family).

Three months into their journey, having hiked miserably through pouring rain, they reach a safety shelter in the mountains; carved into the log wall is an Appalachian Trail map showing their present location on the trail. Dismayed, they note that after three grueling months, they have only hiked approximately half of the trail's total length.

Disheartened, the two ultimately decide to continue on and trek into a restricted section, not noticing a sign that warns them of particularly difficult terrain ahead. While maneuvering their heavy and awkward backpacks alongside a precipitous drop, Bill trips and pulls Stephen with him down a steep, rocky cliff. They fall about fifteen feet onto a ledge from where they are unable to climb back up the slope. They spend a cold night there, and wake in the morning to a group of hikers that help them back up to the trail.

After their rescue, while they are riding a truck down the mountain, the pair mutually decide that it is time to go home – they may not have made it all the way, but they have nonetheless hiked (part of) the Appalachian Trail, which they still consider a personal victory.

When comfortably back at home, Bill, going through his mail, finds a series of postcards from Stephen that were mailed from their various stops along the trail. The last one reads: "What's next?" Bill sits down and begins typing on his computer, A Walk in the Woods.

== Cast ==
- Robert Redford as Bill Bryson
- Nick Nolte as Stephen Katz
- Emma Thompson as Catherine Bryson
- Kristen Schaal as Mary Ellen
- Nick Offerman as REI Dave
- Mary Steenburgen as Jeannie
- Hayley Lovitt as Donna
- R. Keith Harris as Sam Bryson

== Production ==
The project dates back to at least 2005, when Robert Redford first announced his plans to make the film. At various points directors such as Chris Columbus, Barry Levinson and Larry Charles were involved. However, Ken Kwapis ended up directing the picture.

Redford initially wanted Paul Newman to costar in the film with him, to the point that Redford temporarily abandoned the project after Newman's death, feeling no other actor was suitable for the role. However, while directing The Company You Keep, Redford was so impressed by the performance of Nick Nolte that he was eventually cast in the role.

Redford said of the project:

It'll be fun. I don't know when I've read a book that made me laugh so loud. Also, it's a chance to take a look at the country ... The backdrop is pretty terrific, if you stop to think of all the visuals that are possible as they go along that trail.

=== Filming ===
Principal photography of the film began on May 5, 2014, in Los Angeles. Exterior locations were largely filmed at Amicalola Falls State Park in Dawsonville, Georgia, including scenes at The Lodge at Amicalola Falls.

== Release ==
The film premiered at the Sundance Film Festival on January 23, 2015. Shortly after, Broad Green Pictures acquired distribution rights to the film, and gave it a wide theatrical release starting September 2, 2015.

== Reception ==
On Rotten Tomatoes, the film holds an approval rating of 45% based on 163 reviews, with an average rating of 5.4/10. The site's critical consensus reads, "Amiable yet less compelling than any road trip movie starring Robert Redford and Nick Nolte should be, A Walk in the Woods is ultimately a bit too pedestrian." On Metacritic, the film has a weighted average score of 51 out of 100, based on 30 critics, indicating "mixed or average" reviews. On CinemaScore, audiences gave the film an average grade of "B" on an A+ to F scale.
