= The Jolly Fisherman =

1908 railway poster ("Skegness is SO bracing")

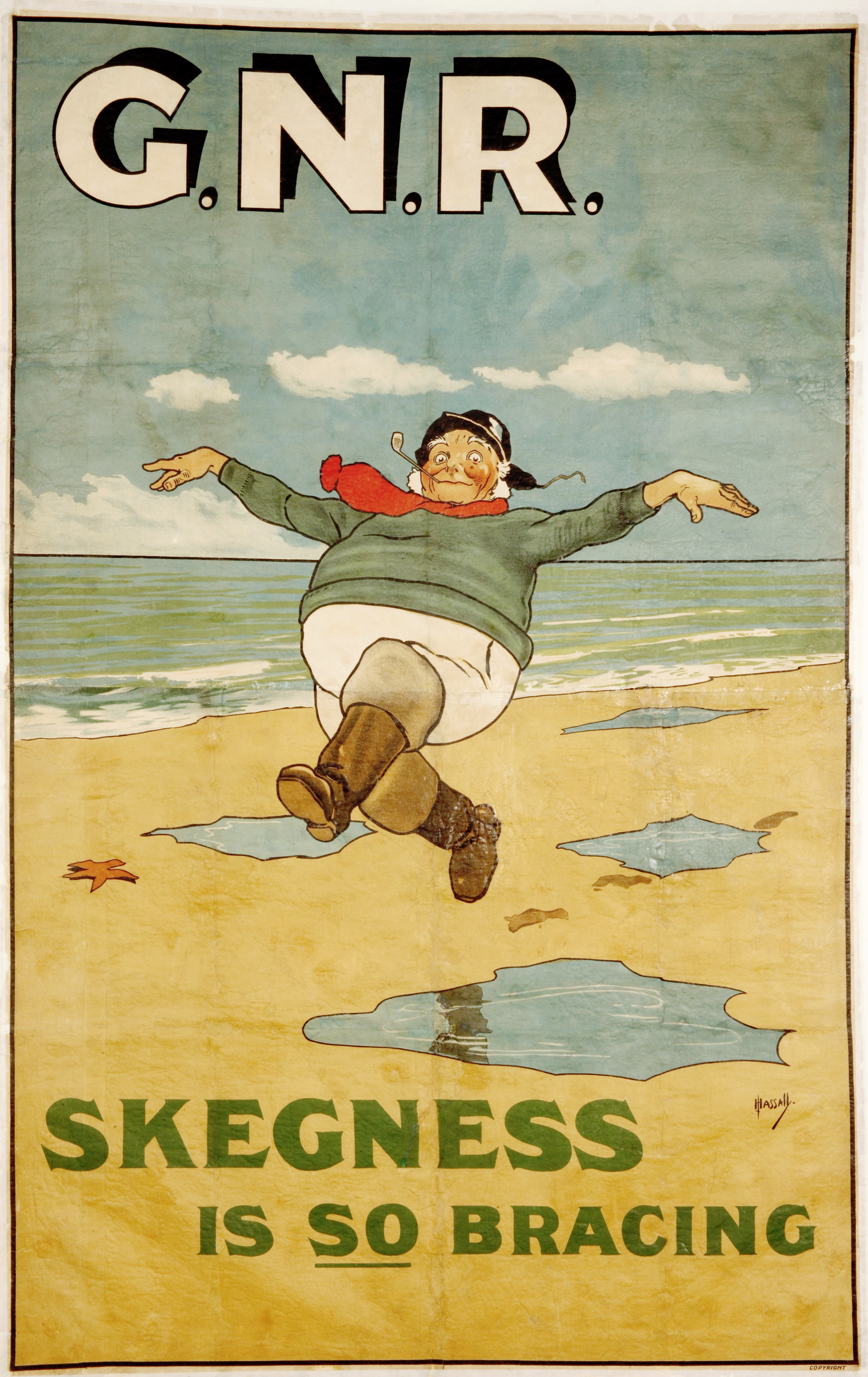
"Skegness is so bracing" (1908) by John Hassall

The Jolly Fisherman is a poster created by artist John Hassall in 1908 after he had been commissioned by the Great Northern Railway (GNR). It is regarded as one of the most famous holiday advertisements of all time and is believed to have influenced the success of Skegness, Lincolnshire, as a holiday destination. Hassall was paid 12 guineas for his work, and the original painting hangs in the town hall at Skegness.

The poster depicts a fisherman skipping along the beach, with the slogan "Skegness is so bracing". There are variations on the design, but the fisherman and the slogan are invariably included. A later poster, promoted by the London & North Eastern Railway (LNER), which succeeded the GNR (Note: The Great Northern Railway was subsumed into the LNER in 1923 as part of the Grouping process.) showed the same fisherman being tugged along the beach by a toddler hanging onto his scarf. John Hassall visited Skegness in 1936, and was quoted as saying that "[Skegness] was even more bracing and attractive than I had been led to expect."

The Jolly Fisherman is now the mascot for Skegness and celebrated his 100th birthday in 2008. As Hassall died in 1948, his work passed into the public domain in 2019 under the British copyright duration of 70 years from the death of the author.

In 2015, a graphic design incorporating the fisherman appeared on the front cover of Bill Bryson's book, The Road to Little Dribbling. However, it transpired that the publishers had failed to obtain permission from the copyright holders, Skegness Town Council.

Also in 2015, the campaign group PETA (People for the Ethical Treatment of Animals), wrote to the town council suggesting that the image of the fisherman be dropped in favour of one showing a flatfish, with the tagline of "A happy plaice". PETA said that the mascot "evokes images of cruelty to animals".

"The Jolly Fisherman" has also been adopted as the name of other places in Lincolnshire, including a restaurant and a resort.

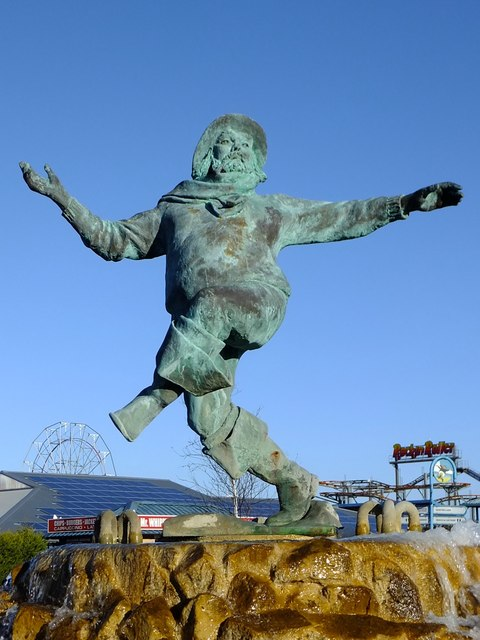
Statue of the Jolly Fisherman in Compass Gardens, Skegness
