= The Life and Times of the Thunderbolt Kid =

2006 memoir by Bill Bryson

- First edition (UK)
- Author: Bill Bryson
- Language: English
- Genre: Non-fiction, Memoir
- Publisher: Broadway Books (US); DoubledayThe audiobook version of this novel is also published by Doubleday Audiobooks. (UK); Doubleday Canada (CDN)
- Publication date: October 17, 2006 (US & CDN); September 1, 2006 (UK)
- Media type: Print (Hardcover, Paperback), Audiobook
- Pages: 288 pp
- ISBN: 0-7679-1936-X (US 1st edition); 0385608268 (UK 1st edition); 0385661614 (CDN 1st edition)
- OCLC: 65205130
- Dewey Decimal: 910.4092 B 22
- LC Class: G154.5.B79 A3 2006

The Life and Times of the Thunderbolt Kid is a 2006 memoir by best-selling travel writer Bill Bryson. The book delves into Bryson's past, telling of his youth growing up in Des Moines, Iowa, during the 1950s and early 1960s. It also reveals the backstory between himself and Stephen Katz, who appeared in A Walk in the Woods and Neither Here Nor There: Travels in Europe. Bryson also describes and comments on American life in the 1950s. The title of the book comes from an imaginary alter ego Bryson invented for himself in his childhood, who has the ability to vaporise people.

The book was released on September 1, 2006, in the United Kingdom, where it was published by Doubleday. In the United States and Canada, the book was launched on October 17, 2006, and was published by Broadway Books and Doubleday Canada respectively.

== Plot ==
Bryson was born on December 8, 1951. He spent his childhood growing up in Des Moines, Iowa, part of the baby-boom generation born in the post-war years. He describes his early life and his parents, Bill Sr. and Mary Bryson. His father was a well-known sports writer for The Des Moines Register, the leading newspaper in Des Moines. His mother was also a writer for the Register, and also wrote for magazines like Better Homes and Gardens, Good Housekeeping, and House Beautiful.

He recounts many things that were invented during his childhood that fascinated him, which include frozen dinners, atomic toilets, and television. His middle-class, all-American lifestyle is shown constantly throughout the book, and the influence of his depression-era raised parents rubs off on him. He also remembers his adventures as "the Thunderbolt Kid", an alter ego he made up for himself when he felt powerless. He was able to vaporize people with his heat vision and thought that he came from another planet. He tells amusing stories of his misadventures as Billy Bryson, including his first days in school when he figured out that when the entire class was running drills to protect themselves from a bomb, he would simply read comic books instead. However, when the principal and a police officer came in one day to supervise, he got in trouble. Trouble was something fairly common for "the Thunderbolt Kid", as throughout his childhood his teachers were unamused by his activities. In fact, Bryson recounts how he really was uninterested in getting up before noon, thus not even going to school very often. Despite his unique behavior, Bryson tells his story through the eyes of a child, filled with hilarious observations about the world — from "Lumpy" Kowalski's curious nickname to the joy that was to be had in the department stores.

Though Bryson focuses mostly on his childhood, he tells of many of the events that were happening at the time, including the development of the atomic bomb, and the beginnings of the civil rights movement. He tells of his first days in junior high and high school, and during both he began smoking, drinking, and stealing, although he didn’t get caught for any of it. He met Stephen Katz in junior high school, when they were both in the school's audio-visual club. Katz would accompany Bryson on many of his travel experiences. At the end of the book, Bryson tells the reader that "life moves on", and that he wishes that the world could be more similar to life in the 1950s and 1960s. The last lines of the book are, "What a wonderful world that would be. What a wonderful world it was. We won’t see its like again, I'm afraid."

== Reception ==
The book received mostly positive reviews from critics. Carole Cadwalladr of The Observer wrote "What Bryson has achieved with this book is final confirmation that he is the Frank Capra of American letters", and later added "And it really is a wonderful life to be immersed in the American Midwest in the Fifties with Bill as your tour guide [...] Bryson has to pad his tale with other stuff. And it's the other stuff at which he excels." Ian Sansom of The Guardian stated "He has a natural-seeming style in which he doesn't so much tell jokes as let his sentences stretch out and relax into feet-up, contented good humour." and "Bryson's descriptions of 50s Des Moines [...] makes you wish that you could emigrate, become a child, get a flat-top haircut and some long-laced baseball boots, and sneak in and take up residence unnoticed with little Billy Bryson in his parents' household." The only complaint Tom Fort of The Daily Telegraph made about the autobiography was that "His handicap is that he is entirely free of the malice, the appetite for smut, scandal and unpleasantness — above all, the narcissism — absolutely essential to the form."

== Editions ==
- ISBN 0-7679-1936-X (US hardcover, 2006)
- ISBN 0-385-60826-8 (UK hardcover, 2006)
- ISBN 0-385-66161-4 (CDN hardcover, 2006)
- ISBN 0-7679-1937-8 (US paperback, 2007)
- ISBN 978-0-552-77254-9 (UK paperback, 2007)
- ISBN 0-385-66162-2 (CDN paperback, 2007)
- ISBN 0-7393-1523-4 (US audiobook, 2006)
- ISBN 978-0-552-15365-2 (UK audiobook, 2006)
