= Gerba =

Gerba may refer to:

- Gerba, a synonym for the moth genus Eudesmia
- Gerba, historic name of the Tunisian island of Djerba
- Gerba, ancient Roman name of Houmt El Souk on the island of Djerba
- Gerba Guracha. a town in central Ethiopia

== People ==
- Ali Gerba (born 1981), Cameroonian footballer
- Amina Gerba (born 1961), Cameroonian–Canadian businesswoman and entrepreneur
- Charles P. Gerba, American microbiologist
