= Angela King (environmentalist) =

British environmentalist

Angela King (born 27 June 1944) co-founded Common Ground, a British organisation which campaigns to link nature with culture and the positive investment people can make in their own localities, with Sue Clifford in 1983. She was Friends of the Earth's first Wildlife Campaigner for England. She went on to be consultant to the Nature Conservancy Council until Common Ground was founded in 1982/3.

Sue Clifford and Angela King have been at the forefront of cultural campaigning in the environmental movement and environmental awareness raising in the arts since they founded Common Ground in 1982/3 with Roger Deakin. With Clifford, she has written and edited a variety of books to help people be more expressive about and be more active within their own locality. She is co-author of England in Particular ‘a celebration of the commonplace, the local, the vernacular and the distinctive’.

== Books ==
- Trees Rivers and Fields (2001) ISBN 978-1903998014
- England in Particular (2006) ISBN 978-0340826164
- The Apple Source Book (2007) ISBN 978-0340951897
- Community Orchards Handbook ISBN 978-1900322928 (2011)
