= The Body: A Guide for Occupants =

Non-fiction book by Bill Bryson

- Author: Bill Bryson
- Language: English
- Genre: Science, non-fiction
- Publisher: Doubleday
- Publication date: 3 October 2019
- Publication place: United Kingdom
- Media type: Hardcover
- Pages: 464
- ISBN: 085752240X
- OCLC: 978-0857522405

The Body: A Guide for Occupants is a non-fiction book by British-American author Bill Bryson, first published in 2019.

It is Bryson's second book of popular science, with the first being A Short History of Nearly Everything published in 2003. After a brief introduction, the book divides itself into several chapters, each of which describes a particular part of the body or, as in the two chapters on diseases, problems that the body can be faced with. Within each chapter, Bryson describes the function of the relevant biological system, emphasising the history of the scientific developments that led to the current understanding, all with the humour that is characteristic of his writing.

The book has received generally positive reviews with The Guardian headlining their review with "Extraordinary stories about the heart, lungs, genitals ... plus some anger and life advice – all delivered in the inimitable Bryson style". The Independent similarly praised the book for the wide array of dispensable facts contained within the book.
