= At Home: A Short History of Private Life =

2010 book by Bill Bryson

- First edition (UK)
- Author: Bill Bryson
- Language: English
- Genre: History, nonfiction
- Publisher: Doubleday
- Publication date: 27 May 2010
- Publication place: United Kingdom
- Media type: Hardcover, paperback, E-book
- Pages: 536
- ISBN: 978-0-385-60827-5
- OCLC: 717360862

At Home: A Short History of Private Life is a history of domestic life written by American journalist and author Bill Bryson. It was published in May 2010. The book covers topics of the commerce, architecture, technology and geography that have shaped homes into what they are today, told through a series of "tours" through Bryson's Norfolk rectory that quickly digress into the history of each particular room.

== Chapters ==
=== The Year ===
This chapter starts with Joseph Paxton's Crystal Palace at the Great Exhibition of 1851 and all the difficulties and problems needed to overcome when building it. This chapter sets out the main time frame of the book, the 19th century, focusing on the events of 1851. Also he mentions the significant role of the clergy at the time and its gradual decline throughout the next century.

=== The Setting ===
This chapter includes a discussion of Skara Brae, a Neolithic settlement in Scotland.

=== The Hall ===
The chapter starts with a description of a great hall. Topics discussed include the Volkerwanderung (Great Migration), grubenhaus architecture, doors, windows, chimneys, and the travels of Queen Elizabeth I.

=== The Kitchen ===
The chapter starts with an introduction to Samuel Pepys, whose diary is recounted in various places in the book. Topics discussed include food adulteration (with multiple references to anecdotes in The Expedition of Humphry Clinker); Nicolas Appert's breakthrough in food preservation technology, Wenham Lake Ice Company, the history of Chicago as a railway center, John Landis Mason's jars, Bryan Donkin's cans, the influence of Mrs Beeton's Book of Household Management, and the diets of people in Victorian England.

=== The Scullery and Larder ===
The inspiration for the chapter are the scullery and larder, so the chapter begins with a discussion of the domestic workers who would traditionally use those rooms. Topics discussed include daily tasks done by servants, treatment and lifestyles of servants, the life of Hannah Cullwick, and slavery in the United States versus the British servant system.

=== The Fuse Box ===
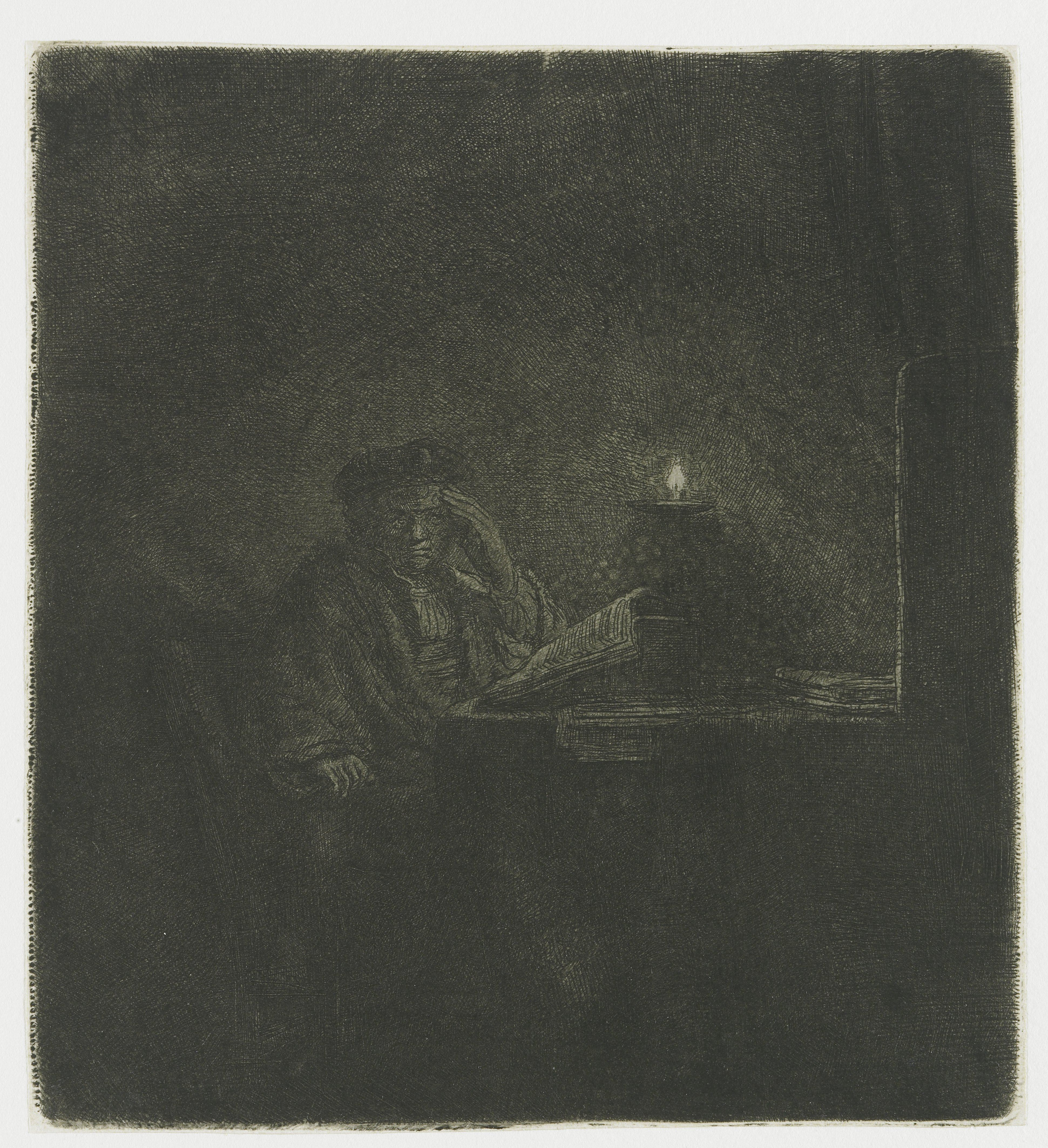
Rembrandt's Student at a Table by Candlelight, referenced in the Fuse Box chapter

The chapter gives a history of artificial lighting. It discusses the British World War II blackout, adult sleeping habits, night-time social habits, crime at night, the Industrial Revolution's impact on sleeping habits, tallow versus beeswax candles, Aimé Argand's lamp, whaling, Abraham Pineo Gesner's invention of kerosene, George Bissell's oil company, gas lighting, and electric lighting.

=== The Drawing Room ===
A drawing room is a room for entertaining visitors and the theme of this chapter is the progression of home comforts. Topics discussed in this chapter include crop rotation; Jethro Tull's seed drill; domestication of cattle; the lives of architects John Vanbrugh, Robert Adam, and James Wyatt; international lumber trade; and Thomas Chippendale among other furniture makers.

=== The Dining Room ===
The dining room is a place for eating and this chapter discusses food. Topics covered include the history of nutrition as a science, scurvy, Christiaan Eijkman's research on beriberi, history of salt, black pepper, the spice trade, the Age of Exploration, history of tea, history of coffee, the East India Company, and table manners.

=== The Cellar ===
Looking at the fundamentals of structural development in construction.

I

The unlikely completion of the Erie Canal in 1825 linking New York to The Great Lakes – “the greatest engineering project the New World had ever seen". This was made possible by the development of water-resistant mortar (hydraulic cement) by little-known engineer Canvass White. This opened up New York's trading potential; its population grew in staggering proportions as a result, securing its primacy within the US.

Pre-colonial US buildings' reliance upon wooden construction, because of a scarcity of good building stone – different log cabin structures explored (“notches"), which can chart the migration patterns of pioneering settlers.

Timber in England becoming a scarce resource because of over-use, for example in the charcoal industry. Availability of domestic limestone from the Jurassic Belt, and the rich availability of clay-based brick in Tudor England provide a rich variety of hues and design patterns (bonds). A series of Brick Taxes discouraged continued use of brick, and prompted the use of stucco, celebrated by John Nash's architectural transformation of Regency London.

II

The profound impact of coal pollution on the environment; on health and everyday living in London. Coade stone and brick proved good building materials. Brick use revived by the abolition of the Brick Tax in 1850. However bricks are less good for tall buildings, which prompted the exploration of alternatives - cast and wrought iron structures caused spectacularly disastrous results (e.g. the Ashtabula River Railroad Disaster and the Tay Bridge disaster) prompting the use of steel and, after 1856, the Bessemer production of molten pig iron. Steel was the material the Industrial Revolution had been waiting for.

=== The Passage ===
Subjects evoked by this 'room': The phenomenon of the Eiffel Tower built for the Paris Exposition, which took longer to design than build, and until superseded by the Chrysler Building in 1930, was the largest building in the world. Having no practical purpose, its benefit was much questioned, and it was not only the greatest edifice ever built of iron, but also the last of significant size.

Rapid economic growth between 1850 and 1900 created a period of hyper self-indulgence in the US known as the Gilded Age, in which every measure of wealth, productivity and well-being skyrocketed. The newly emerging upper class, who’s wealth was mainly derived from industrial success, built on an increasingly grand scale while the collection of European Art and artefacts into the US gathered gained momentum. The Vanderbilt empire – founded on railways and shipping, built many mansions including the Biltmore Estate in North Carolina.

=== The Study ===
The study is historically a quiet storage room. Because of less human traffic, studies can be places for household pests to live, and this chapter talks about humans and pests. Topics covered include James Henry Atkinson's mousetrap, disease vectors, rats, mites, bedbugs, Charles P. Gerba's work on germs in the home, bats, and locusts.

=== The Garden ===
This section touches on such subjects as the first public gardens, Frederick Law Olmsted and his career, and early burial grounds being used as parks.

=== The Plum Room ===
This room is used by Bryson to touch on the history of architecture, starting with the works of Andrea Palladio, and moving on to Monticello and Jefferson, as well as Mount Vernon and Washington.

=== The Stairs ===
This section is about the accidents one can experience on the stairs and elsewhere, and the other objects in the home that, at a time, used to be deadly, such as wallpaper and paint. Fact: more deaths occur from injuries on the stairs than from almost any other cause.

=== The Bedroom ===
This section examines the topics of sex, sleep and death.

=== The Bathroom ===
This section looks at the history of hygiene.

=== The Dressing Room ===
The theme for this chapter is clothing and fashion. Topics discussed include Ötzi the Iceman; the history of linen, hemp, wool, and silk; sumptuary laws; English medieval clothing; wigs in Europe from about 1650 to about 1800; cosmetics; Beau Brummell; history of cotton; James Hargreaves' spinning jenny; Richard Arkwright; Edmund Cartwright; Eli Whitney; corsets; and Victorian fashion.

=== The Nursery ===
This section touches on Victorian notions of childhood, living conditions for the poor including accounts of nineteenth-century workhouses, and the unusual relationships between the aristocratic parent and child.

=== The Attic ===
Covers things such as Charles Darwin, and the fact John Lubbock was his neighbour. John Lubbock became a M.P. and got the Bank Holiday Act introduced.

== Reception ==
The review in The Guardian noted that the book is not really about home, but a venue for Bryson to present each of a series of historical events as a "well-turned story, a mildly humorous aside, a colourful anecdote". Historian Judith Flanders said that "occasionally the book seems to have better jokes than it does a sense of history" but still called the book a "treasure". Another reviewer noted that one with "any interest in furniture, food, fashion, architecture, energy or world history ... (will have) stumbled across some (or all) of the information Bryson has on offer (because) countless books have been written on every subject covered in At Home; many are credited in the ample bibliography".
