= Toilet plume =

Dispersal of microscopic particles from flushing toilet

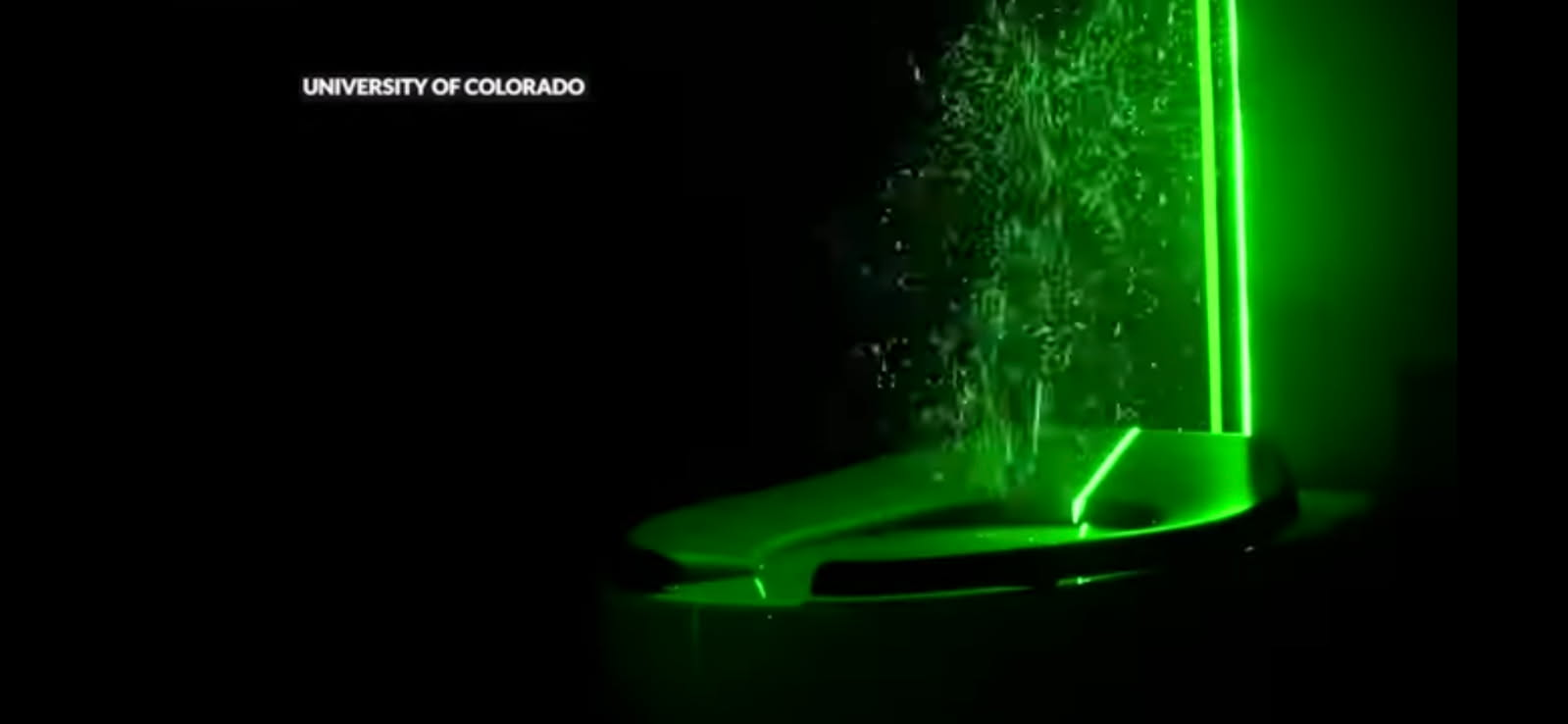
Visualization of aerosol dispersion from a toilet flush using laser.

A toilet plume is the invisible to the naked eye, cloud-like dispersal of raw, infectious sewage particles as a result of flushing a toilet. Flush particles rapidly rise out of the bowl and several feet into the air after flushing, entering one's breathing zone. Aerosolized droplets can remain suspended in the air for tens of minutes between users, continuing to pose shared inhalation risks. These invisible particles go on to coat and spread onto surfaces like floors and counters or objects like hand towels, bathmats, or even toothbrushes. Daily use of a toilet by healthy individuals is considered to pose a lower health risk in terms of infection. However, if an individual is immunocompromised and the previous user was sick and shed out quantities of an infectious virulent pathogen (virus or bacteria) in their urine, feces, or vomitus that would be sufficient for infection, a significantly greater risk may arise to the immunocompromised individual.

Aerosolization of the toilet bowl contents allows infectious particles to free-float haphazardly, then potentially be inhaled and/or land on surfaces. There is evidence that specific pathogens such as norovirus or SARS coronavirus can be spread by toilet aerosols. It has been hypothesized that dispersal of pathogens may be reduced by closing the toilet lid before flushing and by using toilets with lower flush energy. A 2024 study showed evidence that even closing the lid may still lead to small viral particles escaping through gaps under the lid, resulting in viral cross-contamination of the air and surfaces in a washroom.

== Effects on disease transmission ==
A video discussing research on the health hazards of aerosol toilet plumes

There is evidence that toilet aerosols generated by flushing can be a vector for diseases that involve acute gastroenteritis with the shedding of large numbers of pathogens through feces and vomit. For example, some epidemiological studies demonstrate transmission of norovirus in passenger airplanes and ships, and SARS coronavirus through a contaminated building sewage system, from flushing contaminated toilets, aerosolizing pathogens rather than other routes. The feces and vomit of infected people can contain high concentrations of viruses & bacteria many of which are known to survive on surfaces for days, weeks or even months. Toilets are scientifically proven to continue to produce contaminated toilet plumes over multiple successive flushes as indicated in the above video. Some other pathogens speculatively identified as being of potential concern for these reasons include gram-positive MRSA, Mycobacterium tuberculosis, and the pandemic H1N1/09 virus commonly known as "swine flu".

There is 70 plus years of experimental evidence on disease transmission by toilet aerosols. Toilet aerosols are known to contain Norovirus, SARS Coronavirus, Salmonella and many other diseases. The combination of cleaning and disinfecting surfaces is usually effective at removing contamination, although some pathogens such as norovirus and Salmonella have an apparent resistance to these techniques.

== Mechanism ==
Aerosol droplets produced by flushing the toilet can mix with the air of the room, larger droplets will settle on surfaces or objects, creating fomites (infectious pools) before they can dry, like on a countertop or toothbrush; and can contaminate surfaces such as the toilet seat and handle for hours, which can then be contacted by hands of the next user of that toilet. Smaller aerosol particles can become droplet nuclei as a result of the evaporation of the water in the droplet; these have negligible settling velocity and are carried by natural air currents. Disease transmission through droplet nuclei is a concern for many pathogens because they are excreted in feces or vomit. The critical size dividing these dispersal modes depends on the evaporation rate and vertical distance between the toilet and the surface in question.

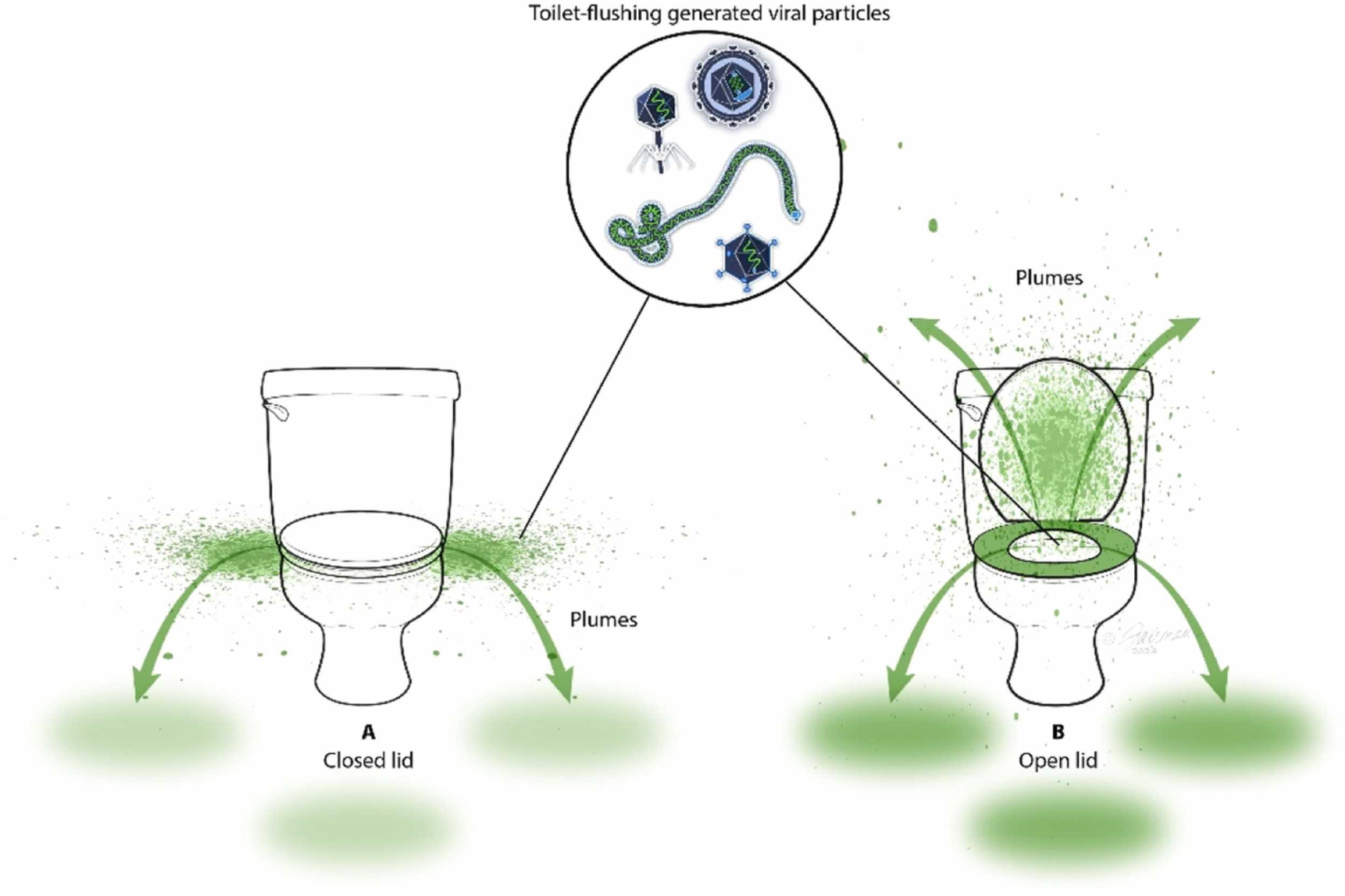
Schematic depiction of virus aerosolization and spread to adjacent areas after flushing a common home toilet

Experiments to test bioaerosol production usually involve seeding a toilet with bacteria or virus particles, or fluorescent microparticles, and then testing for their presence on nearby surfaces and in the air, after varying amounts of time. The amount of bioaerosol varies with the type of flush toilet. Older wash-down toilet designs produce more bioaerosol than modern siphoning toilets. Among modern toilets, bioaerosol production increases as qualitative flush energy increases, from low-flush gravity-flow toilets common in residences to pressure-assisted toilets, to vigorous flushometer toilets often found in public restrooms.

Lowering the toilet lid has been historically believed to help prevent the dispersion of large droplets, and some earlier studies recommended discouraging the use of lidless toilets. However, a January 2024 study showed that there is no statistically significant difference between having the toilet lid raised or lowered during flushes, instead recommending vigorous brushing of the toilet bowl and associated surfaces with disinfectant as a more effective method to mitigate the impact of toilet plumes.

== History ==
Experiments on the bioaerosol content of toilet plumes were first performed in the 1950s. A 1975 study by Charles P. Gerba popularized the concept of disease transmission through toilet plumes. The term "toilet plume" was in use before 1999.
