= Common Ground (United Kingdom) =

Common Ground is a United Kingdom charity and lobby group. Founded in 1982 by Susan Clifford and Angela King, Common Ground aims to promote "local distinctiveness" (a phrase which Common Ground coined during the 1980s).

== Organisation and structure ==
Common Ground has always been a non-membership organisation (grant and donation-funded) with King and Clifford as co-ordinating directors and a small core staff, usually a team assembled for a specific project. Over the years these have included Darren Giddings, Daniel Keech, Jane Kendall, Beatrice Mayfield, Joanna Morland, John Newton, Kate O'Farrell, Helen Porter, Stephen Turner, Neil Sinden and Karen Wimhurst. Originally based in London, they have now settled in Toller Fratrum, Dorset. There are five honorary directors who provide guidance and assessment, including until his death in 2006 founder member Roger Deakin, author of the book Waterlog, a tribute to 'wild swimming'.

== Work with artists ==
With roots in environmental and conservation groups such as Friends of the Earth, King and Clifford felt the commonplace was being overlooked at the expense of the special and rare. Common Ground was formed to address that. Throughout its existence, the organisation has introduced social and environmental ideas through a series of notable initiatives, often involving the connection of communities with artists. They have worked extensively with artists Andy Goldsworthy and Peter Randall-Page. New Milestones, in the late 1980s, brought sculptors into communities in South West England to make works sympathetic to the different landscapes there. Confluence (1998–2001) saw musicians (including animateur Helen Porter and composer Karen Wimhurst) working with community groups along the entire catchment of a river, the Stour in Southern England. Parish Maps encouraged people to make maps of their own places, signalling what was important to the people who lived there rather than dry cartography.

== The 'Great Storm' of 1987 ==
Common Ground were one of the few organisations who saw in the Great Storm of 1987 not wholesale destruction, but an opportunity for nature to reassert itself. They printed and distributed 56,000 postcards, featuring illustrations by David Nash encouraging people to let nature take its course, not to clean up too hastily, as a fallen tree is not necessarily a dead tree.

== Apple Day and promotion of local produce ==
Local produce has been another driving concern for the organisation, with the apple acting in some ways as a symbol for local foods and their impact on community and landscape: "The apple you eat is the landscape you create" reads one of their colourful posters. In 1990 they founded Apple Day as a focus for celebration of the hundreds of apple varieties which are ignored in favour of a handful of supermarket-friendly strains. It has since become well established as an annual event, on 21 October each year. Related to this is their campaign for Community Orchards. In October 2007 Hodder & Stoughton published a fully revised & expanded edition of Common Ground's Apple Source Book which contains a list of the 2,300 apple varieties grown in the British isles.

In 2005 they launched the new project Producing the Goods, exploring distinctive local produce and its marketing. Part of this project included encouraging the production and retail of locally distinctive souvenirs.

== Mapping a spirit of place ==
They devised Local ABCs and Parish Maps as ways of outlining the local distinctiveness of a place. These tools have been widely influential: Parish Maps have been made since the 1980s, beginning with the exhibition 'Knowing Your Place' in 1987; recent examples include West Sussex in the UK, Piemonte district in Italy and in California USA

== Publications ==
Other projects have been publication-based, and have included Field Days and Trees, Woods and the Green Man, and they initiated Richard Mabey's Flora Britannica. They have released a number of books, both with national publishers and self-printed, including Holding Your Ground, Second Nature, Apple Games and Customs, In A Nutshell, The Apple Source Book, From Place to PLACE, New Milestones, Leaves (from an exhibition by Andy Goldsworthy) and three poetry anthologies, Trees Be Company, Field Days and The River's Voice. Their latest major work is England in Particular, an encyclopaedic overview of local distinctiveness that was published by Hodder & Stoughton in May 2006, and the new edition of The Apple Source Book, issued by Hodder in October 2007.

== Common Ground Archive ==
The Common Ground Archive is held by the University of Exeter Special Collections.
