= The Mother Tongue =

1990 book by Bill Bryson

- First edition
- Author: Bill Bryson
- Language: English
- Genre: Language
- Publisher: William Morrow & Co (US); Hamish Hamilton (UK)
- Publication date: July 1990
- Media type: Print
- Pages: 279
- ISBN: 0-380-71543-0
- OCLC: 20934335
- Dewey Decimal: 420.9
- LC Class: PE1072 .B76 1990

The Mother Tongue is a 1990 book by Bill Bryson which compiles the history and origins of the English language and its various quirks. It is subtitled English And How It Got That Way. The book discusses the Indo-European origins of English, the growing status of English as a global language, the complex etymology of English words, the dialects of English, spelling reform, prescriptive grammar, and other topics including swearing. This account popularises the subject and makes it accessible to the lay reader, but it has been criticised for its many inaccuracies, such as the perpetuation of several urban myths.

This book has also been published in the UK by Penguin Books under the title Mother Tongue: The English Language.

Bryson has since followed up this work with Made in America.
