= Bryson's Dictionary of Troublesome Words =

Book by Bill Bryson

- First edition (original title)
- Author: Bill Bryson
- Subject: English language
- Genre: Non-fiction
- Publisher: Penguin Books
- Publication date: 1984 (first edition); 1987 (second edition); 1997 (third edition); 2002 (fourth edition)
- ISBN: 0-7679-1043-5

Bryson's Dictionary of Troublesome Words (ISBN 0-7679-1043-5) is a book by Bill Bryson, published under several titles since 1984, that catalogues some of the English language's most commonly misused words and phrases in order to demonstrate preferable usage. It aims to help writers and editors to think about how to make written communication clearer.

== Publication history ==
It was first published in 1984 with the title The Penguin Dictionary of Troublesome Words (ISBN 014051130X) in the United Kingdom and with the title The Facts on File Dictionary of Troublesome Words (ISBN 0871968894) in the United States. It was republished in a revised edition in 1987; and again in the UK in 1997 under the title Troublesome Words (ISBN 0-14-026640-2). In 2002 it was published as Bryson's Dictionary of Troublesome Words.

== Content ==
Using almost forty standard works on the subject as his guide, Bryson aimed to produce a list of difficult English words that is generally readable and informative while also usable as a reference work.

Like all other major usage advice books, it reflects the language epistemology of professional editors, which is not completely coincident with that of linguistic scientists. It makes use of both linguistic prescription and linguistic description, attempting to avoid the pathological extremes of prescription (valueless pedantry such as hypercorrection) while also making use of its helpful side (which encourages critical thinking).

As the author states, "This book might more accurately, if less convincingly, have been called A Guide to Everything in English Usage That the Author Wasn't Entirely Clear About Until Quite Recently." Bryson describes the English language as a valuable entity, with no two experts agreeing on any point of usage, claiming that those guides that do exist for the common user often expect the reader to be familiar with grammatical terms not encountered since (or even at) high school.
