= Bill Bryson =

American-British author (born 1951)

Bill Bryson OBE HonFRS
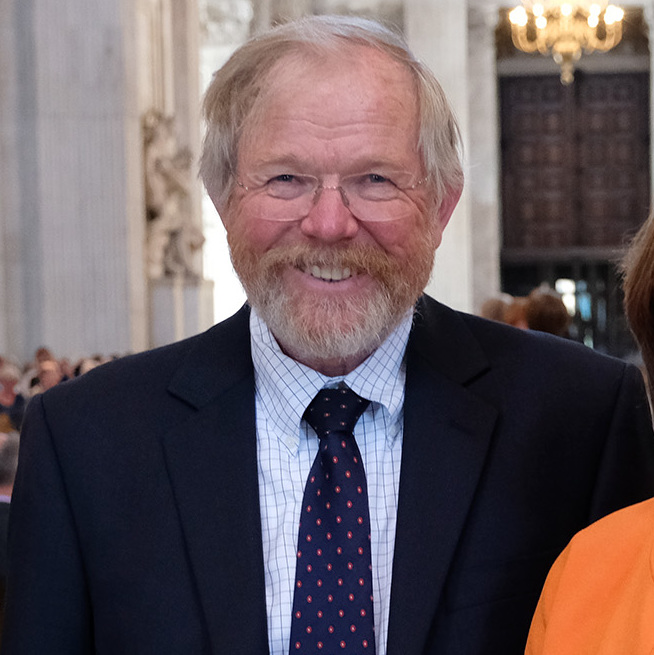
- Bryson in 2018

Chancellor of Durham University
- In office 5 November 2005 – 31 December 2011
- Vice-Chancellor: Kenneth Calman; Chris Higgins
- Preceded by: Peter Ustinov
- Succeeded by: Thomas Allen

Personal details
- Born: William McGuire Bryson; 8 December 1951 (age 74) Des Moines, Iowa, U.S.
- Citizenship: United States; United Kingdom
- Spouse: Cynthia Billen (m. 1975)
- Children: 4
- Education: Drake University (BA)

William McGuire Bryson (/ˈbraɪsən/ BRYE-sən; born 8 December 1951) is an American journalist and author who was naturalized as a British citizen in 2014. Bryson has written nonfiction books on topics including travel, the English language, and science. Bryson moved to Britain in his twenties and remained in the country for most of his adult life. However, he periodically returned to live in the U.S. such as between 1995 and 2003. He was the chancellor of Durham University from 2005 to 2011.

In 1995, while in the United Kingdom, Bryson wrote Notes from a Small Island, an exploration of Britain. In 2003, he authored A Short History of Nearly Everything. In October 2020, he retired from writing books. He has sold over 16 million books worldwide. He recorded an audiobook for Audible, The Secret History of Christmas, in 2022.

== Early life and education ==
Bryson was born and raised in Des Moines, Iowa, the son of Bill Bryson Sr., a sports journalist who worked for 50 years at The Des Moines Register, and Agnes Mary (née McGuire), the home furnishings editor at the same newspaper. His mother was of Irish descent. He had an older brother, Michael (1942–2012), and a sister, Mary Jane Elizabeth. In 2006, Bryson published The Life and Times of the Thunderbolt Kid, a humorous account of his childhood years in Des Moines. In 2006 Frank Cownie, the mayor of Des Moines, awarded Bryson the key to the city and announced that 21 October 2006 would be "Bill Bryson, The Thunderbolt Kid, Day".

Bryson attended Drake University for two years before dropping out in 1972, deciding instead to backpack around Europe for four months. He returned to Europe the following year with a high school friend, Matt Angerer (the pseudonymous Stephen Katz). Bryson wrote about some of his experiences from the trip in his book Neither Here nor There: Travels in Europe.

== Career ==
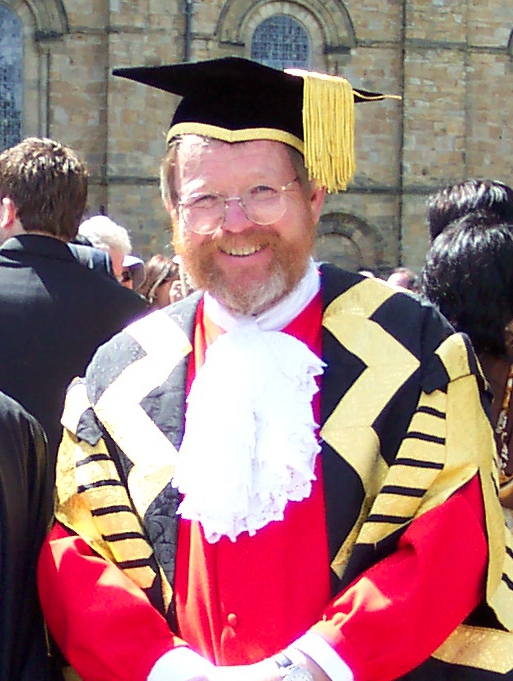
Bryson in the regalia of Chancellor of Durham University in 2005

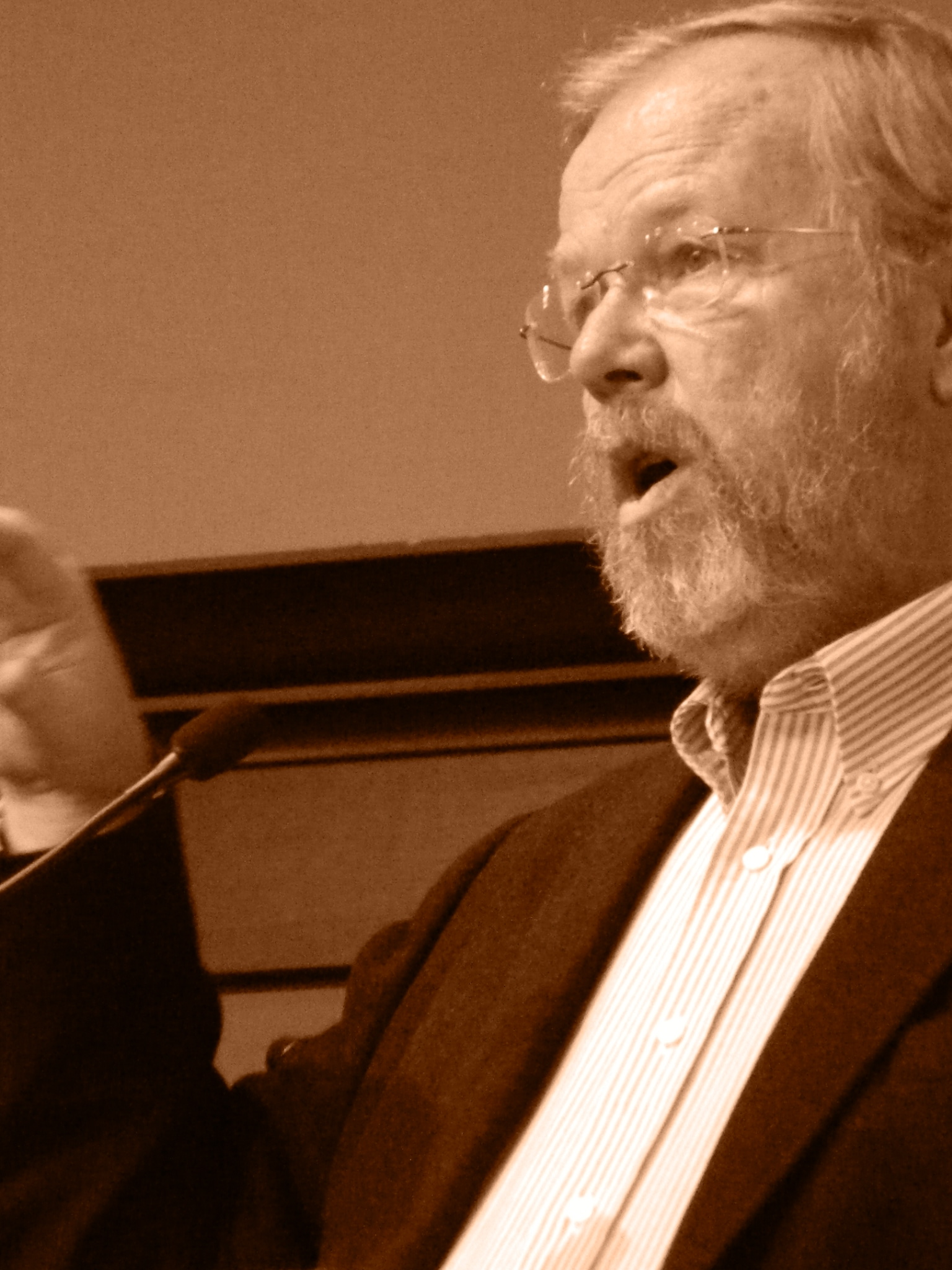
Bryson in 2013

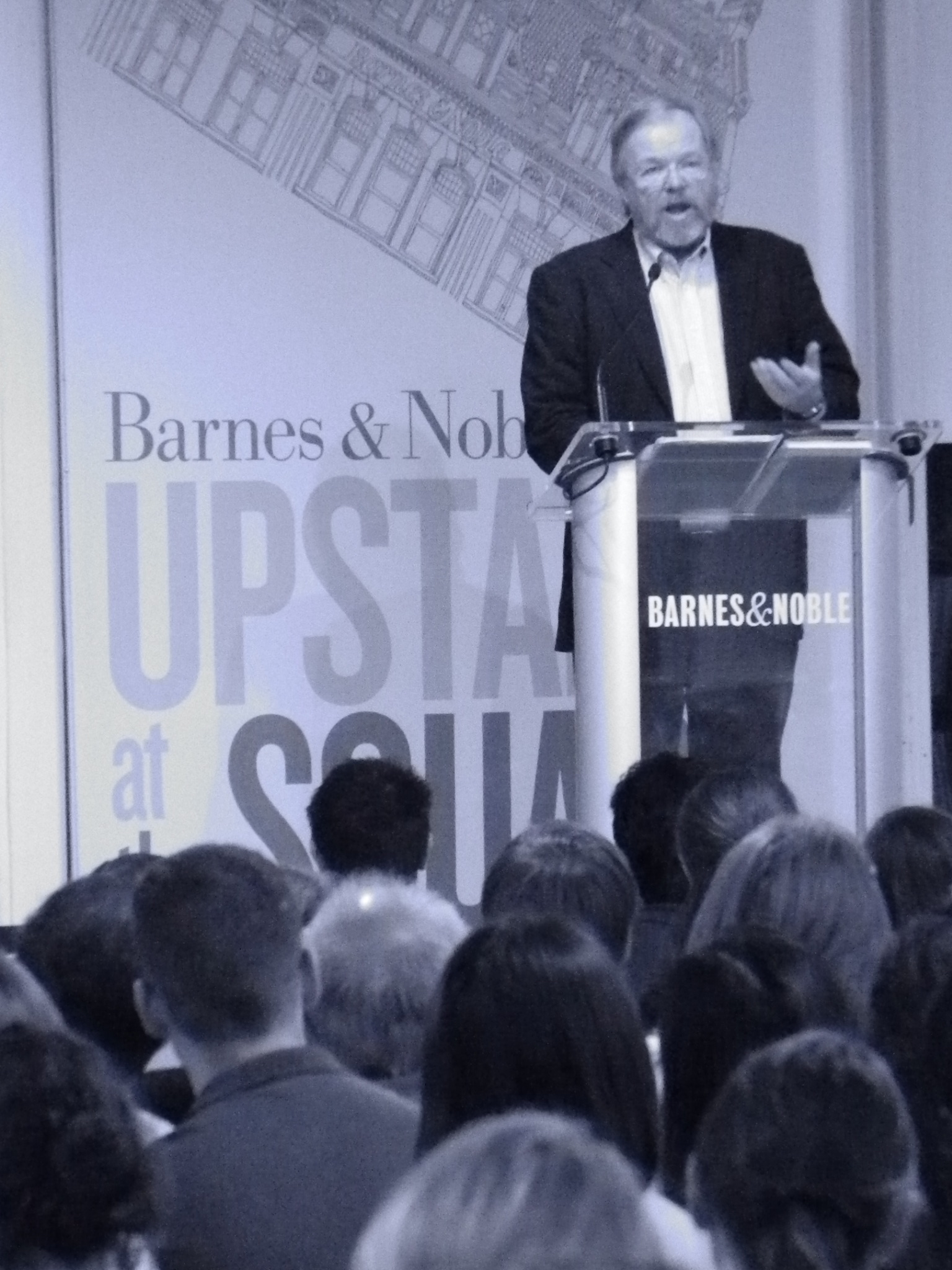
Bryson in 2013

Bryson first visited Great Britain in 1973 during his tour of Europe and decided to stay after securing a job working in a psychiatric hospital, the now-defunct Holloway Sanatorium in Virginia Water, Surrey. He met a nurse there, Cynthia Billen, whom he married in 1975. They moved to Bryson's hometown of Des Moines in 1975 so Bryson could complete his degree at Drake University. In 1977 they settled in Britain.

He worked as a journalist, first for the Bournemouth Evening Echo, eventually becoming chief copy editor of the business section of The Times and deputy national news editor of the business section of The Independent.

The Brysons moved around the United Kingdom, living in Virginia Water (Surrey), Purewell (Dorset), Burton (Dorset), Kirkby Malham, and the Old Rectory in Wramplingham, Norfolk (2003–2013). They currently live in rural Hampshire and maintain a small flat in South Kensington, London. From 1995 to 2003 they lived in Hanover, New Hampshire.

Although able to apply for British citizenship, Bryson said in 2010 that he had declined a citizenship test, declaring himself "too cowardly" to take it. In 2014, he said that he was preparing to take it and in the prologue to his 2015 book The Road to Little Dribbling: More Notes From a Small Island he describes doing so, in Eastleigh. His citizenship ceremony took place in Winchester and he now holds dual citizenship.

=== Writings ===
While living in the U.S. in the 1990s, Bryson wrote a column for a British newspaper for several years, reflecting on humorous aspects of his repatriation in the United States. These columns were selected and adapted to become his book I'm a Stranger Here Myself, alternatively titled Notes from a Big Country in Britain, Canada, and Australia. During his time in the US, Bryson decided to walk parts of the Appalachian Trail with his friend Stephen Katz (a pseudonym), about which he wrote the book A Walk in the Woods. In the 2015 film adaptation of A Walk in the Woods, Bryson is portrayed by Academy Award winner Robert Redford, and Katz by Nick Nolte.

In 2003, in conjunction with World Book Day, British voters chose Bryson's book Notes from a Small Island as that which best summed up British identity and the state of the nation. Also in 2003, he was appointed a Commissioner for English Heritage.

His popular science book, the 500-page A Short History of Nearly Everything, explores not only the histories and current statuses of the sciences, but also their humble and often humorous beginnings. Although one "top scientist" is alleged to have jokingly described the book as "annoyingly free of mistakes", Bryson makes no such claim, and a list of some of its reported errors is available online.

In November 2006, Bryson interviewed UK prime minister Tony Blair on the state of science and education. Bryson also wrote two popular works on the history of the English language, The Mother Tongue and Made in America—and, more recently, an update of his guide to usage, Bryson's Dictionary of Troublesome Words (first published as The Penguin Dictionary of Troublesome Words in 1983). He also released a podcast, Bill Bryson's Appliance of Science, in 2017.

=== Litigation ===
In 2012, Bryson sued his agent, Jed Mattes Inc., in New York County Supreme Court, claiming it had "failed to perform some of the most fundamental duties of an agent". The case was settled out of court with confidential terms.

In 2013, Bryson claimed copyright on an interview he had given nearly 20 years previously, after the interviewer republished it as an 8,000-word e-book. Amazon removed the e-book from publication.

=== Awards, positions and honours ===
In 2004, he won the Aventis Prize for best general science book that year, with A Short History of Nearly Everything. In 2005, the book won the European Union's Descartes Prize for science communication. In 2005, he received the President's Award from the Royal Society of Chemistry for advancing the cause of the chemical sciences. In 2007, he won the Bradford Washburn Award, from the Museum of Science in Boston, for contributions to the popularization of science.

In 2005, Bryson was appointed chancellor of Durham University, succeeding the late Sir Peter Ustinov. He had praised Durham as "a perfect little city" in Notes from a Small Island.

With the Royal Society of Chemistry, the Bill Bryson Prize for Science Communication was established in 2005. The competition engages students from around the world in explaining science to non-experts. As part of its 350th anniversary celebrations in 2010 the Royal Society commissioned Bryson to edit a collection of essays by scientists and science writers about the history of science and the Royal Society over the previous three and a half centuries entitled Seeing Further.

He was made an honorary Officer of the Order of the British Empire (OBE) for his contribution to literature on 13 December 2006. In 2007, he was awarded the James Joyce Award by the Literary and Historical Society of University College Dublin. After he received British citizenship, his OBE was made substantive.

In May 2007, he became the president of the Campaign to Protect Rural England. His first focus in this role was the establishment of an anti-littering campaign across England. He discussed the future of the countryside with Richard Mabey, Sue Clifford, Nicholas Crane, and Richard Girling at CPRE's Volunteer Conference in November 2007. In 2011, Bryson won the Golden Eagle Award from the Outdoor Writers and Photographers Guild.

Bryson stepped down as chancellor of Durham University at the end of 2011.

In 2012, he received the Kenneth B. Myer Award from the Florey Institute of Neuroscience in Melbourne, Australia.

On 22 November 2012, Durham University officially renamed the Main Library the Bill Bryson Library for his contributions as the university's 11th chancellor (2005–2011). The library also has a cafe named after Bryson's book Notes from a Small Island.

Bryson was elected an Honorary Fellow of the Royal Society (FRS) in 2013, becoming the first non-Briton to receive this honour. His biography at the Society reads,

Bill Bryson is a popular author who is driven by a deep curiosity for the world we live in. Bill's books and lectures demonstrate an abiding love for science and an appreciation for its social importance. His international bestseller, A Short History of Nearly Everything (2003), is widely acclaimed for its accessible communication of science and has since been adapted for children.

He is a vice president of the National Churches Trust.

In January 2007, Bryson was the Schwartz Visiting Fellow at the Pomfret School in Connecticut.

=== Honorary doctorates ===
- Honorary Doctor of the University, The Open University, 2002
- Honorary Doctor of Civil Law, Durham University, 2004
- Honorary Doctorate of Letters, Bournemouth University, 2005
- Honorary Doctorate of Science, University of St Andrews, 2005
- DLitt, University of Leeds, 2005
- Honorary Doctorate of Letters, University of Leicester, 2009
- Doctor of Humane Letters, Drake University, 2009
- Honorary Doctorate of Letters, King's College London, 13 November 2012
- Honorary Doctorate of Science, University of Westminster, 2015
- Honorary Doctor of Humane Letters, University of Iowa, May 2016
- Honorary Doctorate of Letters for services to literature, University of Winchester, October 2016

== Works ==
Bryson has written the following books:

Title	Publication date	Genre	Notes
The Penguin Dictionary of Troublesome Words	26 April 1984	Language	Republished, in 2002, as Bryson's Dictionary of Troublesome Words
The Palace under the Alps and Over 200 Other Unusual, Unspoiled and Infrequently Visited Spots in 16 European Countries	January 1985	Travel	
The Lost Continent: Travels in Small-Town America	August 1989	Travel	
The Mother Tongue: English and How It Got That Way (US) / Mother Tongue: The English Language (UK)	1 June 1990	Language	Adapted for Journeys in English in 2004 for BBC Radio 4.
The Penguin Dictionary for Writers and Editors	29 August 1991	Language	Republished, in 2009, as Bryson's Dictionary: for Writers and Editors
Neither Here nor There: Travels in Europe	1 February 1992	Travel	Featuring Stephen Katz
Made in America (UK) / Made in America: An Informal History of the English Language in the United States (U.S.)	4 July 1994	Language	
Notes from a Small Island	4 April 1995	Travel	Adapted for television by Carlton Television in 1998
A Walk in the Woods: Rediscovering America on the Appalachian Trail	1 November 1997	Travel	Featuring Stephen Katz and adapted into a feature film in 2015
Notes from a Big Country (UK) / I'm a Stranger Here Myself (U.S.)	1 January 1999	Travel	
Down Under (UK) / In a Sunburned Country (U.S.)	6 June 2000	Travel	Republished, in 2002, as an omnibus with A Walk in the Woods titled Walkabout
Bill Bryson's African Diary	3 December 2002	Travel	Travels in Africa for CARE International
A Short History of Nearly Everything	6 May 2003	Science	Adapted, in 2009, as an illustrated children's edition titled A Really Short History of Nearly Everything
The Life and Times of the Thunderbolt Kid: Travels Through My Childhood	17 October 2006	Memoir	
Shakespeare: The World as Stage	1 January 2007	Biography	
At Home: A Short History of Private Life	27 May 2010	History	
One Summer: America, 1927	1 October 2013	History	
The Road to Little Dribbling: More Notes from a Small Island	8 October 2015	Travel	
The Body: A Guide for Occupants	3 October 2019	Science	Illustrated edition published in 2022; children's edition A Really Short Journey Through the Body published in 2023
The Secret History of Christmas	22 November 2022	History	Released as an audiobook
A Short History of Nearly Everything 2.0	21 October 2025	Science	Fully revised and updated version of his 2003 book

Academic offices
Preceded by Sir Peter Ustinov	Chancellor of Durham University; 2005–2012	Succeeded by Sir Thomas Allen
Non-profit organization positions
Preceded by Sir Max Hastings	President of the Campaign to Protect Rural England; 2007–2012	Succeeded by Sir Andrew Motion
