= Notes from a Small Island =

1995 travel book on Great Britain by American author Bill Bryson

- First edition (UK)
- Author: Bill Bryson
- Language: English
- Genre: Non-fiction
- Publisher: Doubleday (UK); William Morrow (US); Reed Books (Canada)
- Publication date: 1995
- Publication place: United Kingdom
- ISBN: 0-552-99600-9
- OCLC: 60305303

Notes from a Small Island is a humorous travel book on Great Britain by American author Bill Bryson, first published in 1995.

== Overview ==
Bryson wrote Notes from a Small Island when he decided to move back to his native United States, but wanted to take one final trip around Great Britain, which had been his home for over twenty years. Bryson covers all corners of the island, observing and talking to people from as far afield as Exeter in the West Country to John o' Groats at the north-eastern tip of Scotland's mainland. During this trip he insisted on using only public transport, but failed on two occasions: in Oxfordshire and on the journey to John o' Groats he had to rent a car. He also re-visits Virginia Water where he worked at the Holloway Sanatorium when he first came to Britain in 1973. (He met his future wife while employed at Holloway.)

On his way, Bryson provides historical information on the places he visits, and expresses amazement at the heritage in Britain, stating that there were 445,000 listed historical buildings, 12,000 medieval churches, 1,500,000 acres (610,000 ha) of common land, 120,000 miles (190,000 km) of footpaths and public rights-of-way, 600,000 known sites of archaeological interest and that in his Yorkshire village at that time, there were more 17th century buildings than in the whole of North America.

Bryson also pays homage to the humble self-effacing fortitude of British people under trying times, such as the world wars and Great Depression, as well as the various peculiarities of Britain and British English (such as not understanding, on his first arrival, what a counterpane was, and assuming it was something to do with a window. It is a British English word that means quilt.) Bryson also recalls first going into an English tobacconist's and hearing the man in front of him ask for "twenty Number 6", and assuming that everything in Britain was ordered by number. (A popular brand at the time was Players No. 6, and in British English it is usual to ask for 'twenty', meaning a packet of twenty cigarettes, rather than a packet of ten.)

== Reception ==
In an opinion poll organised for World Book Day in 2003, Notes from a Small Island was voted by BBC Radio 4 listeners as the book which best represented England.

The book was adapted for Carlton Television in 1998 and appeared as a six-part 30-minute documentary broadcast on ITV from 10 January to 14 February 1999. The book is also available in audio book format.

Heavily abridged, the book was read in five fifteen-minute episodes by Kerry Shale for BBC Radio 4. It has been repeated on BBC Radio 4 Extra several times.

Bryson praises the city of Durham in the book. He later became Chancellor of Durham University from 2005 to 2011.

The title of Briton Neil Humphreys' book Notes from an Even Smaller Island (written on his experiences in the former Crown Colony of Singapore) is a reference to Bryson's book, Humphreys stating in 2012, "When I read Bill Bryson's travel books, I was inspired to do something similar in Asia (some might say rip him off! Luckily, Bill Bryson doesn't say that!)".
