= Roger Deakin =

English writer, documentary-maker and environmentalist

- Born: Roger Stuart Deakin; 11 February 1943; Watford, England
- Died: 19 August 2006 (aged 63); Mellis, Suffolk, England
- Spouse: Jenny Hind (m. 1973; dissolved 1982)
- Children: 1

Roger Stuart Deakin (11 February 1943 – 19 August 2006) was an English writer, documentary-maker and environmentalist. He was a co-founder and trustee of Common Ground, the arts, culture and environment organisation. Waterlog, the only book he published in his lifetime, topped the UK best seller charts, and founded the wild swimming movement.

Patrick Barkham published a biography of Deakin in 2023 titled simply The Swimmer.

== Life ==
Deakin, an only child, was born in Watford, Hertfordshire. His father was a railway clerk from Walsall in the Midlands, who died when Deakin was 17. Educated at The Haberdashers' Aske's Boys' School, an independent school, based at the time in Hampstead in north-west London, followed by Peterhouse, Cambridge, where Deakin read English under the auspices of writer Kingsley Amis.

Deakin first worked in advertising as a copywriter and creative director for Colman Prentis and Varley, while living in Bayswater, London. He was responsible for the National Coal Board slogan "Come home to a real fire". Following this, he taught French and English at Diss Grammar School for three years.

In 1968, he bought Walnut Tree Farm, a semi-ruined Elizabethan moated, wood-beamed farmhouse on the edge of Mellis Common in Suffolk, near Diss, which he rebuilt and developed over many years and where he lived until his death. He dredged the moat, where he swam daily, planted woodland and bought more of the surrounding fields, where he grew hay and wild flowers. The land included several shepherds huts and Deakin went on to build a cabin for his son Rufus. The house was without central heating but housed an Aga and wide open fireplaces. A colony of swallows lived in the main chimney and for several years chickens and ducks shared his kitchen.

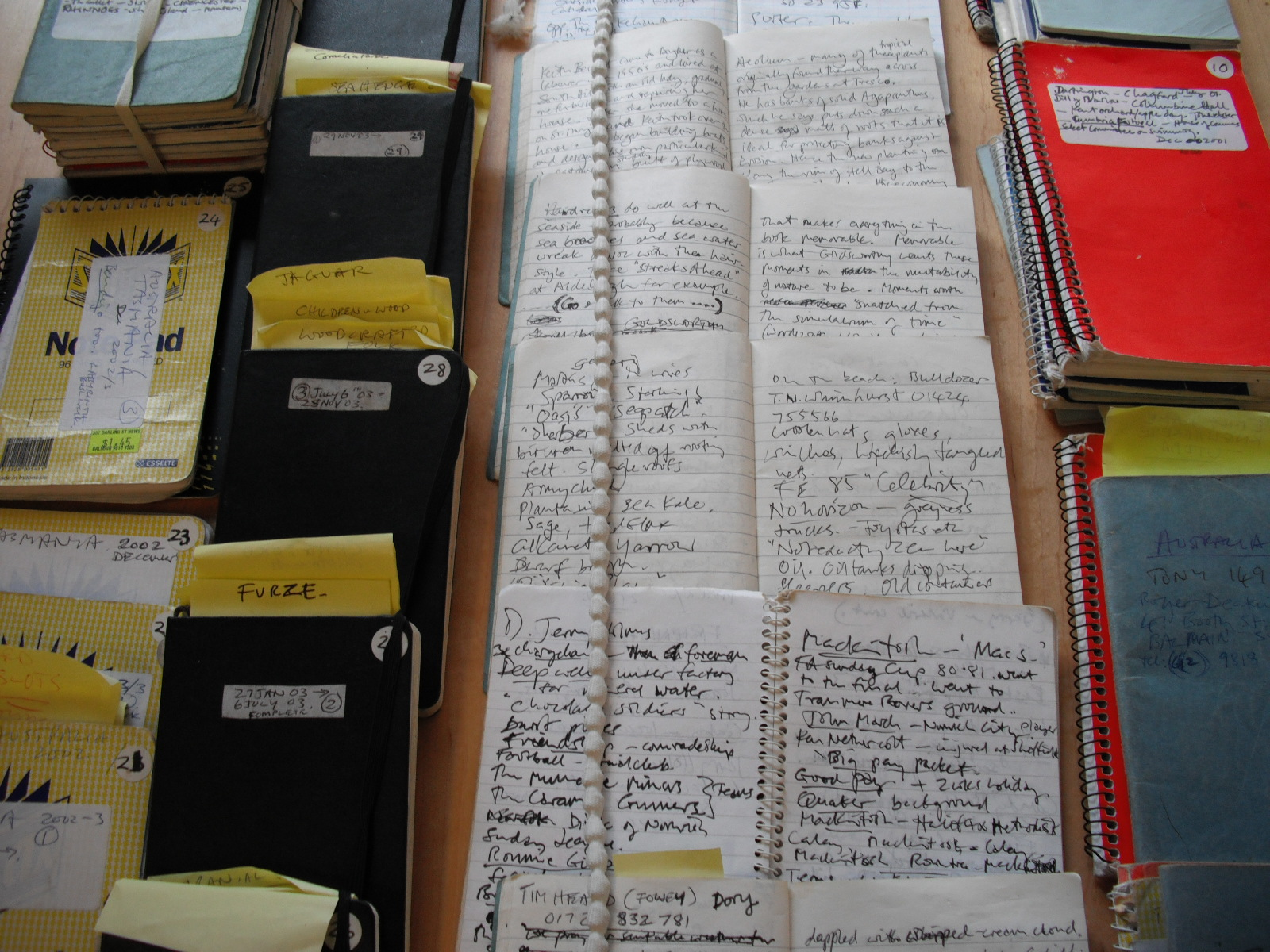
Notebooks from the Roger Deakin Archive at the University of East Anglia

Deakin married Jenny Hind in 1973 with whom he had a son, Rufus, before the marriage was dissolved in 1982. Deakin died, aged 63, in Mellis, Suffolk. He had been diagnosed with a brain tumour only four months previously. He is survived by his partner Alison Hastie and his son. His archive has been given to the University of East Anglia, including writings on ancient trees, along with film banks, photographs, journals and Deakin's swimming trunks. The nature writer Robert Macfarlane was Deakin's literary executor. He commented:

Roger was one of those rare people whose character and passion is to be found in everything he made, collected, drew or wrote. His notes, written to himself, provide an insight into a beautiful mind and a sweet man. This archive will capture what it was like to be a passionate, engaged, subversive country intellectual living through a time of profound change. It is very appropriate that Roger's papers will remain within his beloved East Anglia.

== Work ==
Walnut Tree Farm and its surroundings were the subject of two BBC Radio 4 documentaries, The House and The Garden, that he produced. A further documentary, Cigarette on the Waveney, covered the subject of a canoe trip down the nearby River Waveney. He also made several television documentary films covering subjects as diverse as rock music, Essex, Hank Wangford, allotments and the world of horse racing. Deakin appears in The Wild Places by Robert Macfarlane, whose TV documentary The Wild Places of Essex includes scenes shot at Walnut Tree Farm.

A wind that's already slipped
in and out of several gardens
is churning the blue light of summer
waking sparrow, swift and starling
in my roof – 'Your roof is infested
with birds and mice'
said the chartered surveyor
with no trace of pleasure
at having made
such a discovery

— From "Blue Wind Blue Light",
in the Deakin archive

In 1999, Deakin's acclaimed book Waterlog was published by Chatto and Windus. Inspired in part by the short story The Swimmer by John Cheever, it describes his experiences of 'wild swimming' in Britain's rivers and lakes and advocates open access to the countryside and waterways. The book also inspired a one-hour BBC Four documentary film Wild Swimming, in August 2010, presented by the anthropologist Alice Roberts. The film stated that he was the source for the voice of the swimmer in Alice Oswald's 48-page poem Dart, about the River Dart in Devon.

Deakin's book Wildwood appeared posthumously in 2007. It describes a series of journeys across the globe that Deakin made to meet people whose lives are intimately connected to trees and wood. In November 2008, Notes from Walnut Tree Farm was published to high critical appraisal. Alison Hastie and Terence Blacker, Suffolk critic and novelist, co-edited a collection of writing taken from Deakin's personal notebooks, largely focused on the wildlife and ecology of the area around his farmhouse.

Deakin was a founder director of the arts and environmental charity Common Ground in 1982. Among his environmental causes, he worked to preserve woodland, ancient rights of way and coppicing techniques of Suffolk hedgerows.

== Bibliography ==
- Roger Deakin (1999). Waterlog: A Swimmer's Journey Through Britain. Chatto and Windus. ISBN 0-7011-6652-5.
- Roger Deakin (2007). Wildwood: A Journey Through Trees. Hamish Hamilton Ltd. ISBN 978-0-241-14184-7.
- Roger Deakin (2008). Notes From Walnut Tree Farm. Hamish Hamilton Ltd. ISBN 978-0-241-14420-6.
- Jeff Barrett, ed. (2009). Caught by the River: a collection of words on water. Cassell Illustrated. ISBN 978-1-84403-667-7.
