= Michael Bryson =

American sports reporter (1942–2012)

Michael Gene Bryson (August 22, 1942 – May 22, 2012) was a news and sports reporter and editor from Des Moines, Iowa, Bryson was the son of Bill Bryson Sr., a sports journalist who worked for 50 years at The Des Moines Register, and Agnes Mary (née McGuire), the home furnishings editor at the same newspaper and the elder brother of travel writer Bill Bryson. He co-authored a book The Babe Didn't Point: And Other Stories About Iowans and Sports with his son Michael G. Bryson Jr in 1989. He wrote The Twenty-Four-Inch Home Run in 1990.

Bryson was an editor and associate publisher of the Sun Press Newspapers in Hawaii from 1979 to 1986. He covered the New York Mets in 1969 while a sports reporter for the Associated Press. He was a news reporter for the Des Moines Register and Tribune from 1970 to 1979. He attended Drake University.
