= Notes from a Big Country =

1998 book by Bill Bryson

- Front cover of first edition
- Author: Bill Bryson
- Language: British English
- Subject: Emigration
- Genre: Autobiography/Memoir/Humour
- Publisher: Doubleday
- Publication date: 1998
- Publication place: United Kingdom
- Media type: Paperback
- Pages: 448
- ISBN: 978-0-552-99786-7
- OCLC: 57064968

Notes from a Big Country, or as it was released in the United States, I'm a Stranger Here Myself, is a collection of articles written by Bill Bryson for The Mail on Sunday's Night and Day supplement during the 1990s, published together first in Britain in 1998 and in paperback in 1999. The book discusses Bryson's views on relocating to Hanover, New Hampshire, after spending two decades in Britain.

The American and British editions are not quite identical as, besides spelling differences, some explanatory information suitable for each intended audience is added or omitted within individual articles. This is freely acknowledged in the introduction.

== Content ==
The book contains articles which Bryson wrote for the Mail between 1996 and 1998. He discusses a multitude of topics in the articles such as the death penalty, the war on drugs, gardening, commercials, book tours, inefficiency, Thanksgiving, and air travel.
