= Neither Here nor There: Travels in Europe =

Humorous European travelogue by Bill Bryson

- Author: Bill Bryson
- Language: English
- Publisher: Secker & Warburg
- Publication date: 1991

Neither Here nor There: Travels in Europe is a 1991 humorous travelogue by American writer Bill Bryson. It documents the author's tour of Europe in 1990, with flashbacks to summer tours he made in his college days. On his 1972 tour, he travelled with his friend Matt Angerer, pseudonymised in the book as Stephen Katz, who also appeared more prominently in Bryson's later book A Walk in the Woods, as well as in The Life and Times of the Thunderbolt Kid.

Bryson's trip begins in the winter, in Hammerfest, Norway, where his goal is to see the northern lights. He visits numerous locations throughout Europe, commenting on the various aspects of life in different parts of Europe, and comparing them to how he experienced them in his earlier visits. The book ends with Bryson reaching Istanbul, Turkey, looking across the Bosphorus to Asia, and considering continuing his tour.

== Places visited ==
- Norway (Hammerfest, Oslo)
- France (Paris)
- Belgium (Brussels, Bruges, Antwerp, Spa, Durbuy)
- Germany (Aachen, Cologne, Hamburg)
- The Netherlands (Amsterdam, Haarlem)
- Denmark (Copenhagen)
- Sweden (Gothenburg, Stockholm)
- Italy (Rome, Naples, Sorrento, Capri, Florence, Milan, Como)
- Switzerland (Brig, Geneva, Bern)
- Liechtenstein
- Austria (Innsbruck, Salzburg, Vienna)
- Yugoslavia (Split, Sarajevo, Belgrade)
- Bulgaria (Sofia)
- Turkey (Istanbul)
