= The Lost Continent: Travels in Small-Town America =

1989 travel book by American-British author Bill Bryson (born 1951)

- First edition
- Author: Bill Bryson
- Language: English
- Genre: Non-fiction
- Publisher: Secker and Warburg
- Publication date: 1989
- Publication place: United Kingdom

The Lost Continent: Travels in Small-Town America is a book by travel writer Bill Bryson, chronicling his 13,978-mile (22,495-km) trip around the United States in the autumn of 1987 and spring 1988. It was Bryson's first travel book.

He begins his journey, made almost entirely by car, in his childhood hometown of Des Moines, Iowa, heading from there towards the Mississippi River, often reminiscing about his childhood in Iowa. The journey was made after his father's death, and so is in part a collection of memories of his father in Des Moines while he was growing up.

The book is split into two sections: 'East' and 'West', the former part being considerably longer than the latter. These sections correspond to two separate journeys made in the autumn of 1987 and spring of 1988. The first section covers the Midwest, the Deep South, the East Coast and New England, before returning to Des Moines. The second section focuses on the Great Plains, the South West, California and the Rocky Mountains.

Bryson's goal in this trip was generally to avoid tourist destinations, instead choosing to experience the real every-day America, stopping at small towns and forgotten points of interest. This book is an overview of the United States from Bryson's point of view. There is less focus on factual insight into the history, geography and culture of the destinations in this book than is found in some of Bryson's later books, focusing instead on observations made with the intention of being humorous.

== See also ==
- Americana
