= Bill Bryson Sr. =

American sports journalist (1915–1986)

William Eugene Bryson Sr. (March 3, 1915 – January 31, 1986) was an American sportswriter who wrote for The Des Moines Register from 1937 until his retirement, in 1978. He covered 32 consecutive World Series.

== Career ==
Bryson began his career as a reporter for the Winfield Beacon, his hometown newspaper. He has been called "one of the finest sportswriters in the country and widely recognized as such". As his son Bill describes in The Life and Times of the Thunderbolt Kid, due to the quality of Bryson Sr.'s work, one prominent television sports journalist thought of him as being "possibly the greatest baseball writer there ever was".

== Personal life and death ==
Bryson married Mary Agnes McGuire (1913–2015), an editor for The Des Moines Register. They had three children: Michael, who also became a sports journalist and wrote the book The Babe Didn't Point: And Other Stories About Iowans and Sports; Bill Jr., a prolific writer of travel books; and Mary Elizabeth. Bryson died of an apparent heart attack on January 31, 1986, at his home in Des Moines, Iowa.

Bill Jr. published a tribute to his father in 2001, describing how Bryson had conducted what was probably the last interview with Babe Ruth, just a month before the New York Yankee died, in August 1948. The profile also includes the praise of Bryson noted above by a former NBC News president, who had said he "may have been the best baseball writer ever, anywhere".
