= Made in America (book) =

Book by Bill Bryson

- First US edition
- Author: Bill Bryson
- Language: English
- Publisher: Secker & Warburg (UK); William Morrow (US)
- Publication date: July 1994
- Media type: Print
- Pages: 496
- ISBN: 0-380-71381-0

Made in America is a nonfiction book by Bill Bryson describing the history of the English language in the United States, and the evolution of American culture.
