= Richard Girling =

British journalist and author

Richard Girling is a British journalist and author, known for his writing on the environment.

== Life and career ==
Richard Girling, born in Hitchin, Hertfordshire in 1945, is a journalist for The Sunday Times. In 2002, he won the Specialist Writer category at the British Press Awards. He was awarded the Environmental Journalist of the Year award in 2008 and 2009 at Press Gazette's Environmental Journalism Awards.

== Published works ==
=== Fiction ===
- Ielfstan's Place : 15,000 BC-1919 AD (1981)
- Sprigg's War (1984)

=== Non-Fiction ===
- The Best of Sunday Times Travel (1988) (editor)
- The View From The Top : A Panoramic Portrait of British Landscape (with Paul Barker) (1997)
- Rubbish! Dirt On Our Hands and Crisis Ahead (2005)
- Sea Change: Britain's Coastal Catastrophe (2007; paperback 2012)
- Greed: Why We Can't Help Ourselves (2009)
- The Hunt for the Golden Mole (2014)
- The Man Who Ate the Zoo: Frank Buckland, Forgotten Hero of Natural History (2016)
- The Longest Story: How Humans Have Loved, Hated and Misunderstood Other Species (2021)
