= Charles P. Gerba =

American microbiologist

- Education: University of Miami (Ph.D. in microbiology)
- Scientific career
- Fields: Microbiology
- Workplaces: University of Arizona
- Website: west.arizona.edu/person/charles-gerba

Charles P. Gerba is an American microbiologist. He currently is a professor at the University of Arizona. Gerba serves as a spokesperson for Coverall Health-Based Cleaning System.

== Work ==
Gerba is best known for work in environmental germ theory in the household. His surveys produced scientific backing for two useful bits of everyday advice; in kitchens, a reused washcloth is likely to be the most infectious and germ-carrying object in a house. In the bathroom, a flushed toilet with the seat up will spray germs into the air and disperse them throughout a room through a toilet plume.

In January 2024 after 50 years of research on Toilet Plume, Charles Gerba and his team finally settled the age old debate of: Lid Up or Lid Down when you flush. Scientifically proving that Toilet Plume escapes the toilet when you flush.

Gerba is a spokesperson for Coverall Health-Based Cleaning System. This collaborative relationship focuses on building public awareness about germs, the role they play in business environments and effective cleaning methods for infection control.
