= Stew Thornley =

American sports historian

Stew Thornley (born July 23, 1955 in Minneapolis, Minnesota) is an author of books on sports history, particularly in his home state. He is an official scorer and online gamecaster for the Minnesota Twins. Thornley also does official scoring for Minnesota Timberwolves basketball games.

A leading historian of Minnesota sports, Thornley has authored numerous books, including:

- Holy Cow! The Life and Times of Halsey Hall (Minneapolis: Nodin Press, 1991)
- On to Nicollet: The Glory and Fame of the Minneapolis Millers (Minneapolis: Nodin Press, 1988)
- Minnesota Twins Baseball: Hardball History on the Prairie (Charleston, S.C.:The History Press, 2014)
- Baseball in Minnesota: The Definitive History (St. Paul: Minnesota Historical Society Press, 2006, revised and updated 2021)
