= A Walk in the Woods (book) =

1998 travel book by Bill Bryson

- First edition
- Author: Bill Bryson
- Illustrator: David Cook
- Language: English
- Subject: Appalachian Trail
- Publisher: Doubleday
- Publication date: 5 May 1998
- Publication place: United States
- Media type: Hardcover
- Pages: 274 pp (first edition)
- ISBN: 0-7679-0251-3
- OCLC: 37903447
- Dewey Decimal: 917.404/43 21
- LC Class: F106 .B92 1998

A Walk in the Woods: Rediscovering America on the Appalachian Trail is a 1998 travel book by the writer Bill Bryson, chronicling his attempt to thru-hike the Appalachian Trail during the spring and summer of 1996. For much of his journey, Bryson was accompanied by his friend Matt Angerer (pseudonymously called "Stephen Katz" in the book), who had previously appeared in Bryson's 1991 book Neither Here nor There: Travels in Europe.

Written in a comic style, the book mixes accounts of Bryson's walk with broader discussions about the Trail's history, and the sociology, ecology, conservation status and people of the places Bryson walked through.

== Plot ==
The book starts with Bryson explaining his curiosity about the Appalachian Trail near his house. After buying special leakproof tents, packs, a portable stove, packaged food, and other equipment, he and his old friend Stephen Katz start hiking the trail from Georgia in the South, and stumble in the beginning with the difficulties of getting used to their equipment; Bryson also soon realizes how difficult it is to travel with his friend, who is a crude, overweight recovering alcoholic, and even less prepared for the ordeal than he is. Overburdened, they soon discard much extra food and equipment to lighten their loads. They encounter other interesting hikers along the trail, some of them annoying, and one flirtatious obese woman at a laundromat.

After hiking for what seemed to him a large distance, they realize they have still barely begun while in Gatlinburg, Tennessee, and that the whole endeavor is simply too much for them. They skip a huge section of the trail, beginning again in Roanoke, Virginia. The book recounts Bryson's desire to seek easier terrain as well as "a powerful urge not to be this far south any longer". This section of the hike finally ends (after nearly 800 miles (1,300 km) of hiking) with Bryson going on a book tour and Katz returning to Des Moines, Iowa, to work.

In the following months Bryson continues to hike several smaller parts of the trail, including a visit to Centralia, Pennsylvania, the site of a coal seam fire, and eventually reunites with Katz to hike the Hundred-Mile Wilderness in Maine, which again proves too daunting. Ultimately Bryson hiked about 40% of the trail. In the 21st century, about 25% of thru-hike attempts are successful. Bryson quotes the older figure of 10%.

At the time of his attempt to hike the Appalachian Trail, Bryson was aged in his forties.

== Writing process ==
Bryson admitted that he found the book hard to write, remarking in an interview that "the thing about walking is that it's not eventful. It doesn't generate material. A long walk, a really long walk, is an exceedingly repetitious experience...when I finally got a book out of it, I was kind of astounded." He described himself as "wretchedly homesick" during his hike and that he had had to fictionalize some of Angerer's behavior, as "he was quite depressed at this time...he just felt like life had kicked him in the balls and he wasn’t doing very well. And I portrayed all of that. And it was just depressing...my revelation with that was, instead of making him just depressed, I just made him angry, which he also was. I made it much more that he was angry with the trail rather than angry with life...so it really became the two of us against the trail. And then it started to work much better, I think, as a narrative."

Whilst pleased with his accomplishments on the Trail, Bryson expressed regret that he and Angerer had not completed the 100-Mile Wilderness section. He also identified the Berkshires as the part of the Trail that he would most like to re-hike.

== Film adaptation ==
In 2005, Robert Redford announced, and later confirmed, that he would star in and produce an adaptation of Bryson's book into a film, and that he would play Bryson. He also hoped that his erstwhile co-star and friend, Paul Newman, would team up with him to play the role of Katz, although he jokingly expressed doubt as to whether the health-conscious Newman would consider putting on enough weight to accurately portray the rotund Katz. However, Newman retired from acting in May 2007 and died in 2008.

In February 2007, Chris Columbus, director of Home Alone and the first two Harry Potter films, was reported to have agreed to direct the adaptation. However, in January 2008, the Hollywood Reporter, while noting that the script was delayed due to the Hollywood writers' strike, reported that Barry Levinson, the Academy Award–winning director of Rain Man, was in talks to direct.

Redford has said of the project

It'll be fun. I don't know when I've read a book that I laughed so loud. Also, it's a chance to take a look at the country ... The backdrop is pretty terrific, if you stop to think of all the visuals that are possible as they go along that trail.

In February 2012, it was reported that novelist Richard Russo, during a speech at Union College, confirmed that he was working on the screenplay.

By November 2013, Nick Nolte had been cast to costar as Katz. Larry Charles (of Borat and Brüno) was briefly attached as director, but eventually the job went to Ken Kwapis, whose most recent film was Big Miracle and who was a key figure on the U.S. television series The Office. The screenplay was by Michael Arndt, credited as Rick Kerb, and Bill Holderman, who is a producer at Redford's Wildwood Enterprises. Shooting began in spring 2014. The movie was largely filmed at Amicalola Falls State Park, in Dawsonville, Georgia, including scenes at The Lodge at Amicalola Falls.

The film premiered at the Sundance Film Festival on January 23, 2015, and was released in theaters on September 2, 2015, by Broad Green Pictures.

== Reception ==
A Walk In the Woods was named by CNN as the funniest travel book ever written. A review in The New York Times stated that readers, "may find themselves turning the pages with increasing amusement and anticipation as they discover that they're in the hands of a satirist of the first rank". The New Yorker described the book as a "wry, well-researched account".

The book was met with anger amongst some members of the Appalachian Trail community, with letters to the Appalachian Trailway News, a newsletter of the Appalachian Trail Conservancy, excoriating Bryson for his perceived cynicism, ill-informed complaints and demeaning portrayal of Southerners. Despite this, it has been credited with a 50% increase in long-distance hiker numbers during the two years after publication.

Angerer claimed in a 2015 interview with The Des Moines Register that the book was "true for the most part", but disagreed with Bryson's portrayal of his initial physical fitness and thought that his purported womanizing had been exaggerated. He died in June 2023 at the age of 71.

== Editions ==
- ISBN 0-7679-0251-3. Hardback. Published by Broadway Books, on May 4, 1998.
- ISBN 0-7679-0252-1. Paperback. Published by Broadway Books, on May 4, 1999.
