= A Short History of Nearly Everything =

2003 book by Bill Bryson

- First edition (UK)
- Author: Bill Bryson
- Language: English
- Genre: Non-fiction
- Publisher: Doubleday (UK); Broadway Books (US)
- Publication date: 2003
- Media type: Print (Hardcover, Paperback, E-Book)
- ISBN: 0-7679-0817-1
- OCLC: 51900381
- Dewey Decimal: 500 21
- LC Class: Q162 .B88 2003

A Short History of Nearly Everything by American-British author Bill Bryson is a popular science book that explains some areas of science, using easily accessible language that appeals more to the general public than many other books dedicated to the subject. It was one of the bestselling popular science books of 2005 in the United Kingdom, selling over 300,000 copies.

A Short History deviates from Bryson's popular travel book genre, instead describing general sciences such as chemistry, paleontology, astronomy, and particle physics. In it, he explores time from the Big Bang to the discovery of quantum mechanics, via evolution and geology.

== Background ==
Bill Bryson wrote this book because he was dissatisfied with his scientific knowledge—that was, not much at all. He writes that science was a distant, unexplained subject at school. Textbooks and teachers alike did not ignite the passion for knowledge in him, mainly because they never delved into the whys, hows, and whens.

"It was as if [the textbook writer] wanted to keep the good stuff secret by making all of it soberly unfathomable."

— Bryson, on the state of science books used within his school

== Contents ==
Bryson describes graphically and in layperson's terms the size of the universe and that of atoms and subatomic particles. He then explores the history of geology and biology and traces life from its first appearance to today's modern humans, emphasizing the development of the modern Homo sapiens. Furthermore, he discusses the possibility of the Earth being struck by a meteorite and reflects on human capabilities of spotting a meteor before it impacts the Earth, and the extensive damage that such an event would cause. He also describes some of the most recent destructive disasters of volcanic origin in the history of our planet, including Krakatoa and Yellowstone National Park.

A large part of the book is devoted to relating humorous stories about the scientists behind the research and discoveries and their sometimes eccentric behaviours. Bryson also speaks about modern scientific views on human effects on the Earth's climate and livelihood of other species, and the magnitude of natural disasters such as earthquakes, volcanoes, tsunamis, hurricanes, and the mass extinctions caused by some of these events.

An illustrated edition of the book was released in November 2005. A few editions in audiobook form are also available, including an abridged version read by the author, and at least three unabridged versions.

== Second edition ==
Recognising both the errors in the original and, more importantly, the significant advances in scientific knowledge, a second edition was published in late 2025. This contains extensive revisions to all chapters.

== Awards and reviews ==
The book received generally favourable reviews, with reviewers citing the book as informative, well-written, and entertaining.

In 2004, this book won Bryson The Aventis Prizes for Science Books for best general science book. Bryson later donated the GBP£10,000 prize to the Great Ormond Street Hospital children's charity. It was shortlisted for the Samuel Johnson Prize for the same year.

In 2005, the book won the EU Descartes Prize for science communication.

== See also ==
- Big History
