= Midpoint Trade Books =

Midpoint Trade Books, Inc. is a Sales, Marketing, and Distribution Company founded by Eric M. Kampmann and Chris Bell in 1996. Midpoint represents over 250 independent publishers across the United States, Canada, England, Scotland, Australia, and Ireland. Midpoint's sales team presents to both national and regional big-box and specialty accounts across the United States and Canada.

Kampmann & Company also owns publishing companies Spencer Hill Press and Beaufort Books. Beaufort includes the imprints Moyer Bell and Papier-Mache Press. Beaufort Books famously published the O.J Simpson hypothetical tell-all book If I Did It. By court order, all proceeds from and rights to the bestselling book belong to the family of murder victim Ron Goldman.

== Acquisition by IPG ==
On August 17, 2018, Midpoint Trade Books was sold to Independent Publishers Group (IPG). About the acquisition, IPG's CEO, Joe Matthews said that the publishing industry "is consolidating because distribution rewards scale, requires expensive technology, and demands high-level access to customers."
