= Juiced (pay-per-view special) =

2006 program starring O. J. Simpson

- DVD title card
- Genre: Hidden camera-prank show
- Directed by: Frank Dracman
- Starring: O. J. Simpson

Production
- Executive producer: Rick Mahr
- Producer: Todd Lewis
- Cinematography: Luc Nicknair
- Running time: 58 minutes
- Production company: Extreme Entertainment Group

Original release
- Network: Pay-per-view
- Release: 2006

Juiced (stylized as Juiced with O.J. Simpson or O.J. Simpson: Juiced) is a 2006 pay-per-view special starring former professional football player and actor O. J. Simpson. Modeled after popular hidden-camera prank shows such as MTV's Punk'd, the program featured Simpson wearing disguises to perform practical jokes on members of the public.

Juiced was distributed as a pay-per-view special and was subsequently released straight to DVD. The program received public backlash due to Simpson's trial of the murder of his ex-wife, Nicole Brown Simpson and Ron Goldman, for which he was acquitted but held civilly liable in 1997.

== Premise ==
The program follows a hidden camera-prank show format. Simpson wears various disguises to place unsuspecting members of the public in uncomfortable scenarios. At the reveal of each prank, Simpson would reveal himself to be O.J. Simpson and proclaim: "You've been Juiced!".

== History ==
Following his acquittal in the murder of his ex-wife, Nicole Brown Simpson, and Ron Goldman, and the subsequent civil trial for which Simpson was held liable, Simpson faced financial difficulties and was largely blacklisted from mainstream media. Rick Mahr, who was known for extreme videos such as backyard wrestling, conceived Juiced as a concept to capitalize on Simpson's notoriety.

Principal photography took place in March 2004 over a two-week period in Las Vegas. Reportedly, the production was tense, with crew members attempting to push boundaries and to elicit statements from Simpson regarding his involvement in the murder of Nicole Brown Simpson and Ron Goldman.

After production of the special was leaked by a crew member, major networks refused to air the program. Production therefore had to bypass traditional means and released the footage as a pay-per-view special followed by a DVD release. According to Mahr, Simpson was not paid to participate in the show and participated only because he wanted to.

== Notable segments ==
In a skit described as "tone-deaf", Simpson posed as a used car salesman and attempted to sell his white Ford Bronco. Directly referencing his 1994 police chase in Los Angeles, the vehicle had fake bullet holes in the side. In the skit, Simpson described the vehicle as helping him get away and telling a buyer that he made the car famous, saying "If you ever get into some trouble and have to get away, it has escapability."

== Reception ==
On release, Juiced received overwhelming negative criticism. Particularly Fred Goldman, the father of Ron Goldman, described the special as "morally reprehensible".

== Legacy ==
In September 2026, Investigation Discovery and HBO Max released a docuseries titled O.J. Unseen: Exploration of Evil. The docuseries examined the making of Juiced and includes interviews with crew members. The docuseries included behind the scenes footage showing crew members attempting to capture a confession from Simpson.
