= Pablo Fenjves =

American screenwriter (born 1953)

- Born: August 16, 1953 (age 73); Caracas, Venezuela
- Occupations: Screenwriter; ghostwriter
- Notable work: If I Did It: Confessions of the Killer (2007)

Pablo F. Fenjves (/ˈfɛnvɪs/; born August 16, 1953) is an American screenwriter and ghostwriter based in Los Angeles, California. His screenwriting credits include the 1995 film The Affair, the 2012 film Man on a Ledge, and a string of television films. Fenjves ghostwrote the book If I Did It: Confessions of the Killer, an account of the murder of Nicole Brown Simpson and Ron Goldman, which was published in 2007.

== Early life and career ==
Pablo F. Fenjves was born in Caracas, Venezuela, on August 16, 1953, to Hungarian Holocaust survivors. He went to Lake Forest College in Illinois. Fenjves' first journalism job was in Canada. He joined the National Enquirer in Florida in the late 1970s, where he befriended Judith Regan.

Fenjves has ghostwritten more than a dozen books, including two number one New York Times Best-Sellers, Witness and Blood Brother. He also ghostwrote the autobiographies and memoirs of Bernie Mac, Janice Dickinson, and David Foster.

== If I Did It: Confessions of the Killer ==
Fenjves collaborated with O. J. Simpson to ghostwrite If I Did It: Confessions of the Killer, an account of the murder of Nicole Brown Simpson and Ron Goldman. The book was pulled by the publisher just weeks before its release date, but it was subsequently revived by Fred Goldman, father of murder victim Ron Goldman, and spent five weeks on The New York Times Best Seller list. Fenjves had a personal connection to the murder, as he lived a few doors down from the Brentwood murder scene, and had testified against Simpson regarding the time at which he heard Nicole Brown Simpson's dog barking.

Fenjves stated in interviews that Simpson actively collaborated on the manuscript and that he knew Simpson was a murderer.
