= If I Did It: Confessions of the Killer =

2007 book by O.J. Simpson and Pablo Fenjves

- 2007 print cover
- Author: O.J. Simpson; Pablo Fenjves (ghostwriter); Dominick Dunne; The Goldman family
- Original title: If I Did It
- Publisher: Beaufort Books (Regan Books/HarperCollins, before cancellation)
- Publication date: September 13, 2007
- Publication place: United States
- Media type: Hardback
- Pages: 210
- ISBN: 978-0-8253-0588-7
- Preceded by: I Want to Tell You: My Response to Your Letters, Your Messages, Your Questions

If I Did It: Confessions of the Killer is a book authored by O. J. Simpson with ghostwriter Pablo Fenjves, in which Simpson puts forth a hypothetical description of the 1994 murders of Nicole Brown Simpson and Ron Goldman. According to Fenjves, the book is based on extensive discussions with Simpson. Simpson was acquitted of the murders in a criminal trial but later was found financially liable in a civil trial. Although the original release of the book was canceled shortly after it was announced in November 2006, 400,000 physical copies of the original book were printed, and copies of it had been leaked online by June 2007.

The book was originally due to be published by ReganBooks, an imprint of HarperCollins, which was headed by editor and publisher Judith Regan. Television network Fox, at the time a sister to HarperCollins via News Corporation, was to broadcast an interview special with Simpson to promote the book, O.J. Simpson: If I Did It, Here's How It Happened. However, the special was also canceled following objections by several Fox station owners. Footage from the interview was aired for the first time during a Fox special, O.J. Simpson: The Lost Confession?, in March 2018.

In August 2007, a Florida bankruptcy court awarded the rights to the book to the Goldman family to partially satisfy the civil judgment. The book's title was changed from If I Did It to If I Did It: Confessions of the Killer, and this version was published by Beaufort Books, a New York City publishing house owned by parent company Kampmann & Company/Midpoint Trade Books. Comments were added to the original manuscript by the Goldman family, Fenjves, and journalist Dominick Dunne. The new cover design printed the word "If" greatly reduced in size compared with the other words, and placed inside the word "I", so unless looked at very closely, the title of the book appears to read "I Did It: Confessions of the Killer".

== Content ==
"Nicole. Jesus. I looked down and saw her on the ground in front of me, curled up in a fetal position at the base of the stairs, not moving. Goldman was only a few feet away, slumped against the bars of the fence. He wasn't moving either. Both he and Nicole were lying in giant pools of blood. I had never seen so much blood in my life. It didn't seem real, and none of it computed."

— If I Did It: Confessions of the Killer, Simpson, Fenjves (2006), p. 81.

The first part of the If I Did It manuscript contains a detailed description of Simpson's early relationship and marriage with Nicole Brown Simpson. The latter part of the manuscript describes details of the events on June 12, 1994, and about the murders as they could have occurred if Simpson had committed them. Simpson's attorney said that there is "only one chapter that deals with their deaths and that chapter, in my understanding, has a disclaimer that it's complete fiction."

In Simpson's hypothetical scenario, he has an unwilling accomplice named "Charlie" (a generic name put forth by Fenjves and given to O.J.'s 'friend') who urges Simpson not to follow through with his plans to "scare the shit out of" Nicole. Simpson ignores Charlie's advice and continues to Nicole's condo, where he finds and confronts Ron Goldman. According to the book, Nicole falls and hits her head on the concrete, and Goldman crouches in a karate pose. As the confrontation escalates, Simpson writes, "Then something went horribly wrong, and I know what happened, but I can't tell you how." He writes that he regained consciousness later with no memory of the actual act of murder.

== Publication history ==
=== Production ===
Cover of the recalled edition

Simpson's eldest daughter, Arnelle Simpson, testified in a deposition that she and Van Exel, president of Raffles Entertainment and Music Production, came up with the idea for the book and pitched it to her father in an attempt to make money. She testified that her father thought about it and eventually agreed to the book deal. Simpson stated, "I have nothing to confess. This was an opportunity for my kids to get their financial legacy. My kids understand. I made it clear that it's blood money, but it's no different than any of the other writers who did books on this case."

The book was originally due to be published by ReganBooks, an imprint of HarperCollins, which was headed by editor and publisher Judith Regan who would also interview Simpson in the planned television special based on the book. Regan was quoted by the Associated Press as saying "This is a historic case, and I consider this his confession." Pablo Fenjves, a screenwriter and prosecution witness at Simpson's 1995 trial, ghostwrote Simpson's book. Fenjves stated in interviews that Simpson actively collaborated on the manuscript, and that Fenjves believed Simpson was guilty of murder. Simpson said he had little to do with the book's creation, but Fenjves in contrast said the book was based on discussions he and Simpson had on the matter.

The book was unofficially announced in the National Enquirer in late October 2006; this was immediately denied by Simpson's lawyer. The book was then formally announced some weeks later in mid-November 2006 for release on November 30. The first version's cover, as released by HarperCollins, shows a photograph of Simpson with the words "I Did It" in red and the word "If" in white. The Beaufort version had the words "I Did It" in large type and the word "If" written in a tiny font and placed at the top of the "I". Neither version of the book has Simpson's name on the front cover. HarperCollins and ReganBooks had planned to publish the book on November 30, 2006. The National Enquirer made unproven claims in October 2006 that Simpson would be paid US$3.5 million for the book.

=== Pre-publication controversy ===
If I Did It ignited a storm of pre-publication controversy, largely due to the perception that Simpson was trying to profit from the two deaths for which his civil suit verdict had found him liable. Sara Nelson, editor-in-chief of Publishers Weekly said: "This is not about being heard. This is about trying to cash in, in a pathetic way, on some notoriety." Patricia Schroeder, president and chief executive of the Association of American Publishers, felt that the book would "stir an awful lot of debate and make the culture take a real look at itself, and that may not be unhealthy".

Denise Brown, sister of murder victim Nicole Brown Simpson, expressed her hope that the publisher would take "full accountability for promoting the wrongdoing of criminals and leveraging this forum and the actions of Simpson to commercialize abuse". She went on to say that Simpson's two children would be "exposed to [his] inexplicable behavior and we will provide them with our love and support during this time. It's unfortunate that [O.J.] Simpson has decided to awaken a nightmare that we have painfully endured and worked so hard to move beyond." The proposed book also outraged the family of Ron Goldman, who criticized the publisher for "helping a murderer get his voice out there". According to lawyers for the family, they planned to attempt to garnish any earnings Simpson might get from the book. Fred Goldman, Ron's father, was awarded $33.5 million by a jury in 1997 for the wrongful death of his son; however, Simpson never paid this judgment due to a California law that prevents pensions from being used to satisfy judgments, and the fact that the bulk of his income comes from his NFL pension. Goldman described the book and television interview as "an all-time low" and "morally reprehensible to me ... to think you are willing to give somebody airtime about how they would murder two people."

The day after the announcement of its publication, an online boycott encouraged Americans to ignore the book and complain to publishers and booksellers. Similar boycotts were held in Australia and Europe. Within four days of the book's announcement, over 58,394 people had signed an online petition developed by Goldman's family, DontPayOJ.com, declaring their opposition to the book. Bookshops were divided about stocking the title in their stores. Numerous independent stores said either that they would not sell it or would offer limited copies and give away the proceeds. Borders Books and Waldenbooks said they would donate any profits made from the book to charities which would benefit victims of domestic violence, and a Borders spokesperson said they "believe it is the right of customers to decide what they read and what to buy, but we will not discount the title or promote it". Several stores in Canada said they would only order it for customers, but not stock it. In the days following the book's announcement, pre-orders put it in the top 20 of Amazon.com's bestseller list; it fell to No. 51 when the book's cancellation was announced.

Legal experts theorized that Simpson might be able to avoid paying the Goldmans or Browns any money. Lawyer Tom Mesereau said Simpson might have profits "paid into a trust offshore or a corporation in a different name, and commented: "I think it's going to be difficult if [Simpson] arranges to have [book profits] deposited abroad. It's one thing to enforce a judgment in America, and another to enforce it overseas."

=== Fox television interview ===
Fox, an American television network that was a sister to HarperCollins via News Corporation at the time, was to air a related, two-part, taped interview with Simpson, conducted by Regan, in which Simpson describes how he would have committed the 1994 slayings of Nicole and Goldman, "if he were the one responsible". As in the book, Simpson also mentions an unwilling accomplice named "Charlie". The interview was scheduled to air on November 27 and November 29, 2006, timed to coincide with the book's release. The program was being produced under Fox's alternative programming department, headed by Mike Darnell, and not under the auspices of Fox News Channel. NBC said that it was approached to air the interview, but declined, saying, "This is not a project appropriate for our network." On November 16, 2006, Regan issued a statement claiming that her reason for recording the interview and releasing the book was an attempt to find closure after having been a battered woman herself. She said: "The men who lied and cheated and beat me – they were all there in the room. And the people who denied it, they were there, too. And though it might sound a little strange, Nicole and Ron were in my heart. And for them I wanted him to confess his sins, do penance, and to amend his life. Amen."

Over a dozen Fox affiliates refused to carry the special, or decided to air it, but devote local advertising time to public service announcements. KSFX-TV in Springfield, Missouri, WPGH-TV in Pittsburgh, and WWCP-TV in Johnstown-Altoona-State College, Pennsylvania area, were the first to turn down the special on November 17, 2006, along with KAYU-TV in Spokane, Washington, and WDRB in Louisville, Kentucky. Pappas Telecasting also planned to pre-empt the program on their Fox stations in four markets, along with Fox affiliates KNDX in Bismarck-Minot, North Dakota; KMPH-TV in Fresno, California; KPTH in Sioux City, Iowa; KTVG-TV in Lincoln, Superior and Grand Island, Nebraska; and KPTM in Omaha, Nebraska. Fox affiliates KCPQ in Seattle—owned by Tribune Company—and XETV in San Diego/Tijuana—were both reportedly undecided; each indicated that if they aired the special, they would not sell local ad time, instead giving that time to local domestic violence groups to air public service announcements. The interview was later aired for the first time as O.J. Simpson: The Lost Confession? in March 2018.

=== Cancellation ===
Intense public criticism led to the cancellation of the book's publication and a related television interview, both from divisions of News Corporation (Fox and HarperCollins, of which ReganBooks was an imprint). On November 20, 2006, News Corporation issued a statement saying that the book and television special had been cancelled. In the statement, News Corporation chairman and CEO Rupert Murdoch said, "I and senior management agree with the American public that this was an ill-considered project. We are sorry for any pain this has caused the families of Ron Goldman and Nicole Brown-Simpson." The Associated Press called the book's cancellation "an astonishing end to a story like no other", noting that a publisher's withdrawing a book for its content "is virtually unheard of". According to a Newsweek story, all 400,000 printed copies were recalled for "pulping", except for one, locked away in a vault at News Corporation. A copy later appeared in an auction listing on eBay in September 2007, selling for $65,000; a second listing eventually sold in 2023 for over $250,000. James Wolcott of Vanity Fair also obtained a "pristine hardcover" copy of the book for a review published in January 2007.

On November 21, 2006, Denise Brown accused Fox of trying to stop the Goldman and Brown families from criticizing the project by offering millions of dollars for their silence surrounding the project. Brown said: "They wanted to offer us millions of dollars. Millions of dollars for, like, 'Oh, I'm sorry' money. But they were still going to air the show. We just thought, 'Oh my God.' What they're trying to do is trying to keep us quiet, trying to make this like hush money, trying to go around the civil verdict, giving us this money to keep our mouths shut."

Brown told NBC's Today that her family's response was "absolutely not". Fox confirmed that the Brown and Goldman families were offered profit participation deals for the projects but denies that it was hush money. News Corp spokesman Andrew Butcher said: "Last week, when concerns were raised by the public that we were profiting from this guy's story, we tried to work out some arrangement with the family. Never was there any suggestion of them being barred from talking about it. We would never suggest that."

=== Transfer of rights ===
The rights to the book were held by Lorraine Brooke Associates, a shell corporation set up in the name of Simpson's children. Fred Goldman, Ron Goldman's father, sued the corporation for the book rights in order to help satisfy the $33.5 million wrongful death civil suit judgment against Simpson. After a California judge ordered the rights to be auctioned off and the proceeds to go to Goldman, Lorraine Brooke Associates filed for bankruptcy in April 2007.

Fred Goldman then pursued the matter in bankruptcy court. In June 2007, a federal judge ruled that Goldman could pursue the publishing rights to Simpson's book. In July 2007, a federal bankruptcy judge awarded the rights to the book to the Goldman family. As part of the agreement, the Goldmans must pay 10 percent of the first $4 million in gross proceeds to a court-appointed trustee, with most of that money going to the Brown family. The Brown family had opposed the deal, asking for a larger share of the proceeds.

The Chapter 7 bankruptcy of Lorraine Brooke Associates (Case No. 1:07-bk-12641) was overseen by Judge A. Jay Cristol in the Southern District of Florida, with Drew M. Dillworth appointed as trustee. The proceedings involved debtor's counsel Brian G. Rich, special counsel Paul J. Battista, Peter T. Haven, and Jonathan G. Polak, as well as Mark S. Roher and the Zee Law Group P.C. representing various interests in the case.

=== Republication ===
After Goldman had won the rights to the book, he arranged to publish it under the new title If I Did It: Confessions of the Killer. The Goldman family's lawyers also announced intentions to pursue new publishing, film, or TV deals in order to receive some of $33.5 million awarded to them in the civil case.

On August 14, 2007, it was reported that a literary agent for the Goldman family, Sharlene Martin, had made a deal to publish the book with the new subtitle "Confessions of the Killer". All of the original text was to remain intact, with the addition of "key commentary". This version of the book was published by Beaufort Books, a New York City publishing house owned by parent company Kampmann & Company/Midpoint Trade Books and was released about a month later, on September 13, 2007, coincidentally the same day Simpson participated in an armed robbery. Some of the proceeds benefit the Ronald Lyle Goldman Justice Foundation, which was planned in 1995 to fund civil legal action against Simpson. Denise Brown, sister of Nicole Brown Simpson, opposed the publication of the book and called for a boycott.

=== Airing of the unaired interview in 2018 ===
Since the interview existed on tape, executives at Fox said it was likely to turn up somewhere or be leaked. Nearly twelve years later, Fox announced that it would air a special entitled O.J. Simpson: The Lost Confession?, on March 11, 2018. It featured footage from the interview, as well as analysis and discussion by host Soledad O'Brien and experts. It aired with limited commercial time, which was used to broadcast public service announcements addressing domestic violence. Fox notably scheduled the special against the premiere of the revival of former Fox series American Idol on ABC.

In one portion of an interview Regan said to Simpson, "You wrote, 'I have never seen so much blood in my life.'" Simpson responded, "I don't think any two people could be murdered without everybody being covered in blood." Simpson initially used conditional phrases like "I would" and "I'd think" in his hypothetical description of the event but later moved to using first-person indicative phrasing with sentences like "I remember I grabbed the knife", "I don't remember except I'm standing there", "I don't recall", and "I must have". Due to the change in phrasing, these comments were interpreted by many as being a form of confession, which stirred strong reactions in print media and the internet.

== See also ==
- "I Admit", a 2018 song by R. Kelly
