= Lovelock Correctional Center =

Prison in Nevada, United States

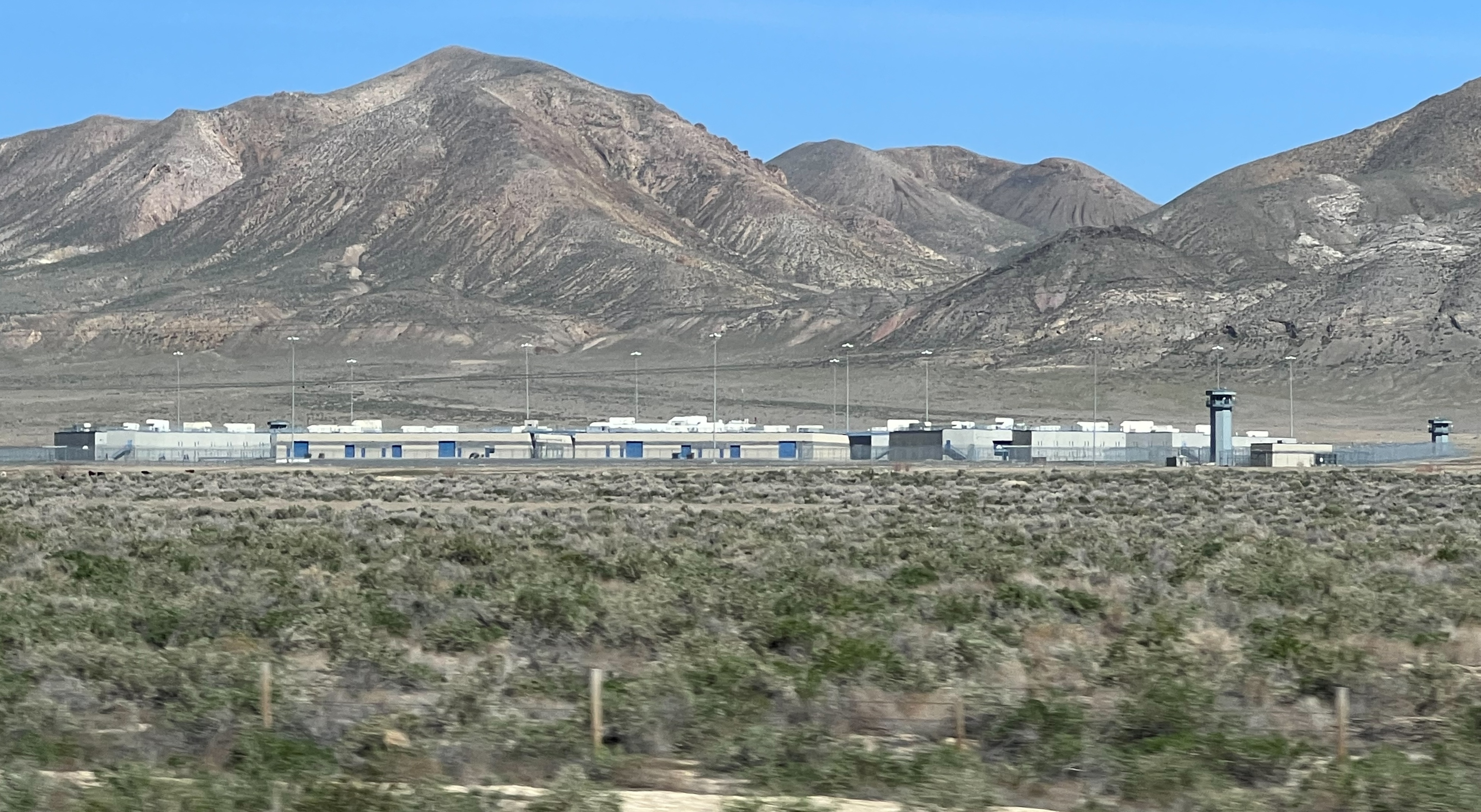
- The center in 2023
- Interactive map of Lovelock Correctional Center
- Location: 1200 Prison Road, Pershing County, Nevada, 89419 U.S.; 40°13′22″N 118°23′18″W 40.221123, -118.389614
- Status: Operational every day
- Security class: Minimum-Close
- Population: 1,680
- Opened: August 1995
- Warden: Nethanjah Breitenbach
- Website: Official website

Notable prisoners
- O. J. Simpson (2008–2017)

Lovelock Correctional Center (LCC) is a Nevada Department of Corrections prison in unincorporated Pershing County, Nevada, United States, near Lovelock.

== History ==
Lovelock is in Pershing County and is the seventh major institution of the Nevada Department of Corrections. It was constructed and opened in two phases. The first started in August 1995 with two 168-cell housing units. Each 80-square-foot (7.4 m^{2}) cell can house two inmates. Construction on the second phase saw two 168-cell units and two 84-cell units made available for the institution to hold 1,680 offenders. Its industrial plant, housed in two 20,000-square-foot (1,900 m^{2}) buildings, makes garments and mattresses.

The facility received wide media coverage in 2008 when former American football star O. J. Simpson was sent there after being sentenced to 33 years' imprisonment. He had been convicted of armed robbery and kidnapping the year before.

His sentence required him to serve a minimum of nine years before becoming eligible for parole. Parole was granted to him on July 20, 2017, in his first year of eligibility. He was released on October 1, 2017.
