= O. J. Simpson =

American football player and actor (1947–2024)

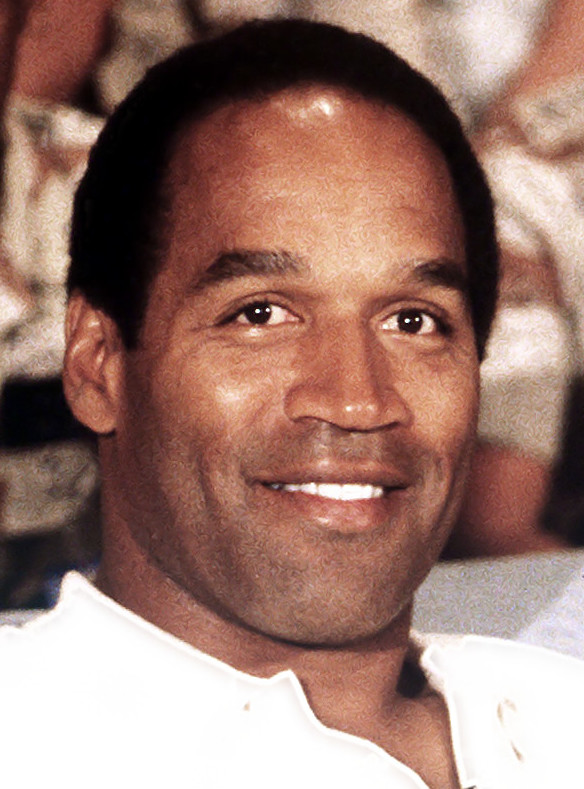
- Simpson in 1990
- Born: Orenthal James Simpson; July 9, 1947; San Francisco, California, U.S.
- Died: April 10, 2024 (aged 76); Las Vegas, Nevada, U.S.
- Other name: The Juice
- Occupations: Football player; actor; sports broadcaster
- Known for: Football career; murder trial; robbery case
- Criminal charges: Armed robbery; kidnapping (2007)
- Criminal penalty: 33 years imprisonment; 9 years without parole; (2008)
- Criminal status: Acquitted (1995); Convicted (2008); Paroled (2017); Discharged from parole (2021)
- Spouses: Marguerite Whitley (m. 1967; div. 1979) Nicole Brown (m. 1985; div. 1992)
- Children: 5
- Football career

No. 32
- Position: Running back

Personal information
- Listed height: 6 ft 2 in (1.88 m)
- Listed weight: 212 lb (96 kg)

Career information
- High school: Galileo (San Francisco)
- College: CCSF (1965–1966); USC (1967–1968)
- NFL draft: 1969: 1st round, 1st overall pick

Career history
- Buffalo Bills (1969–1977); San Francisco 49ers (1978–1979)

Awards and highlights
- NFL Most Valuable Player (1973); NFL Offensive Player of the Year (1973); 5× First-team All-Pro (1972–1976); 5× Pro Bowl (1972–1976); AFL All-Star (1969); AP Athlete of the Year (1973); SN Athlete of the Year (1973); Hickok Belt (1973); 3× UPI AFC Offensive Player of the Year (1972, 1973, 1975); 4× NFL rushing yards leader (1972, 1973, 1975, 1976); 2× NFL rushing touchdowns leader (1973, 1975); NFL scoring leader (1975); NFL 1970s All-Decade Team; NFL 75th Anniversary All-Time Team; NFL 100th Anniversary All-Time Team; Buffalo Bills Wall of Fame (Note: Simpson was removed from the Buffalo Bills Wall of Fame when the team opened the new Highmark Stadium in 2026.); National champion (1967); Heisman Trophy (1968); 2× Walter Camp Award (1967, 1968); 2× UPI Player of the Year (1967, 1968); 2× NCAA rushing yards leader (1967, 1968); NCAA rushing touchdowns leader (1968); NCAA scoring leader (1968); USC Trojans No. 32 retired

Career NFL statistics
- Rushing yards: 11,236
- Rushing average: 4.7
- Rushing touchdowns: 61
- Receptions: 203
- Receiving yards: 2,142
- Receiving touchdowns: 14
- Stats at Pro Football Reference
- Pro Football Hall of Fame
- College Football Hall of Fame
- O. J. Simpson's voice Simpson's 911 call during the Bronco chase Recorded June 17, 1994

Orenthal James Simpson (July 9, 1947 – April 10, 2024), nicknamed "the Juice", (Note: The name was a play on "OJ", an abbreviation of orange juice.) was an American football player, actor, and media personality. He played in the National Football League (NFL) for 11 seasons—nine of which with the Buffalo Bills—and is regarded as one of the greatest running backs of all time. His success is widely considered to be overshadowed by his two criminal charges for the 1994 murders of his ex-wife Nicole Brown and her friend Ron Goldman, and the contentious criminal trial in which he was acquitted on both counts.

Simpson played college football for the USC Trojans, winning the 1968 Heisman Trophy as a senior. He was selected first overall by the Bills in the 1969 NFL/AFL draft. With the Bills, he received five consecutive Pro Bowl and first-team All-Pro selections from 1972 to 1976. He led the league in rushing yards four times, in rushing touchdowns twice, and in points scored in 1975. Simpson became the first NFL player to rush for more than 2,000 yards in a season—earning him 1973's NFL Most Valuable Player (MVP) award—and he is the only player to do so in a 14-game regular season. He also holds the record for the single-season yards-per-game average, at 143.1.

After retiring with the San Francisco 49ers in 1979, Simpson was inducted into the College Football Hall of Fame and Pro Football Hall of Fame. He acted in film and television—notably, in the Naked Gun film franchise—and was also a sportscaster for NBC and ABC, and a celebrity spokesman for various brands like Hertz.

Brown and Goldman were fatally stabbed at Brown's home in Los Angeles on June 12, 1994. Simpson was issued an arrest warrant for the murders on June 17, and within hours, he and his friend Al Cowlings had gone missing, as Cowlings drove him away from public view in a white Ford Bronco. Authorities found the car, and then chased it across L.A. County as Simpson threatened suicide with a gun. Aerial telecopter footage of the chase was broadcast live to about 95 million concurrent viewers.

Simpson's murder trial from January to October 1995 was also televised, and received international publicity. It exacerbated racial divisions in the U.S.; Simpson, a black man, was accused of killing two white people, while his defense team claimed that the L.A. Police Department had tried to frame him for the crime in an act of racist corruption. Simpson's acquittal was viewed on television by approximately 100–150 million people. In 1997, he was found liable for the murders in a civil case brought by the victims' families; he ultimately paid little of the resulting $33.5 million judgment. A 2007 nonfiction book that Simpson co-authored detailed a hypothetical scenario in which he committed both murders and then escaped punishment; he still claimed that in reality, he was innocent.

In 2007, Simpson took part in an armed robbery of sports memorabilia in Las Vegas that involved kidnapping and assault. For this, he was convicted in 2008, and sentenced to 33 years' imprisonment, with a minimum of nine years without parole. He was incarcerated at Lovelock Correctional Center in Nevada until 2017, when he was released on parole. He then lived in Florida and Nevada until his death in 2024 from cancer.

== Early life ==
Born in 1947 in San Francisco, California, Simpson was a son of Eunice (née Durden), an orderly at a psychiatric ward, and Jimmy Lee Simpson, a custodian for a Federal Reserve Bank and a private club and a cook. His father was also a well-known drag queen in the Bay Area and later in his life came out as gay. He died of AIDS in 1986.

Simpson's maternal grandparents were from Louisiana. His aunt gave him the name Orenthal, which she told him was the name of a French or Italian actor she liked. He was called "O.J." from birth and did not know that Orenthal was his given name until a teacher read it in third grade. Simpson had one brother, Melvin Leon "Truman" Simpson, one living sister, Shirley Simpson-Baker, and one deceased sister, Carmelita Simpson-Durio.

Simpson grew up in San Francisco and lived with his family in the housing projects of the low-income Potrero Hill neighborhood. In 1952, when Simpson was age 4, his parents separated, and afterwards, he and his siblings were raised by their mother. As a child, Simpson developed rickets, and wore leg braces until the age of five, giving him his bowlegged stance. He earned money by scalping tickets and collecting seat cushions at Kezar Stadium.

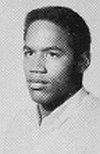
Simpson's 1964 school portrait

In his early teenage years, Simpson joined a street gang called the Persian Warriors and was briefly incarcerated at the San Francisco Youth Guidance Center. His future wife Marguerite, whom he dated in high school, described him as "really an awful person then." He was arrested three times. After his third arrest, Simpson happened to meet baseball star Willie Mays, who encouraged the youth to avoid trouble. He said it helped persuade him to reform.

Simpson first practiced sports at the Potrero Hill Recreation Center, which welcomed black people. At Galileo High School (now Galileo Academy of Science and Technology) in San Francisco, Simpson played for the school football team, the Galileo Lions. He played as a tackle and then as a fullback. At Galileo High School Al Cowlings and Simpson became friends. Meanwhile, he started earning money by organizing dances and charging admission. He graduated in 1965.

== College football and track career ==
Although Simpson was an All-City football player at Galileo, his mediocre high-school grades prevented him from attracting the interest of many college recruiters. After a childhood friend's injury in the Vietnam War influenced Simpson to stay out of the military, he enrolled at City College of San Francisco in 1965. He played football both as a running back and defensive back and was named to the Junior College All-American team as a running back. Simpson also ran for the City College of San Francisco Rams track and field team. City College won the Prune Bowl against Long Beach City College, and many colleges sought Simpson as a transfer student for football.

In 1967, Simpson enrolled at the University of Southern California (USC) in Los Angeles, which he had admired as a young football fan. He had also considered going to the University of Utah. He played running back with the Trojans for head coach John McKay in 1967 and 1968. Simpson led the nation in rushing both years under McKay: in 1967 with 1,543 yards and 13 touchdowns, and in 1968 with 1,880 yards on 383 carries.

In its 1967 game against its crosstown rival UCLA, USC was down by six points in the fourth quarter with under 11 minutes remaining. On its own 36, USC backup quarterback Toby Page called an audible on third and seven. Simpson's 64-yard touchdown run tied the score, and the extra point provided a 21–20 lead, which was the final score. This was the biggest play in what is regarded as one of the greatest football games of the 20th century, and pictures of the play were published in many national magazines. Another dramatic touchdown in the same game is the subject of the Arnold Friberg oil painting, O.J. Simpson Breaks for Daylight. Simpson also won the Walter Camp Award in 1967 and was a two-time unanimous All-American. USC would go on to win the national title for that year. Even though Simpson led the nation in college football rushing yards, the Heisman Trophy went to UCLA's Gary Beban; Simpson was second in voting.

Simpson was an aspiring track athlete. Before playing football at USC, he ran the third leg of a sprint relay quartet that broke the world record in the 4 × 110-yard relay at the NCAA track championships in Provo, Utah on June 17, 1967. They had a time of 38.6 seconds. Also that year, he had a 100-yard dash time of 9.53 seconds. He lost a 100 m race at Stanford University against the then-British record holder Menzies Campbell.

As Simpson rose in popularity, he avoided controversy, such as not participating in a boycott of the 1968 Olympics, which was supported by activists like Martin Luther King Jr. as a protest against racial injustice in the U.S.

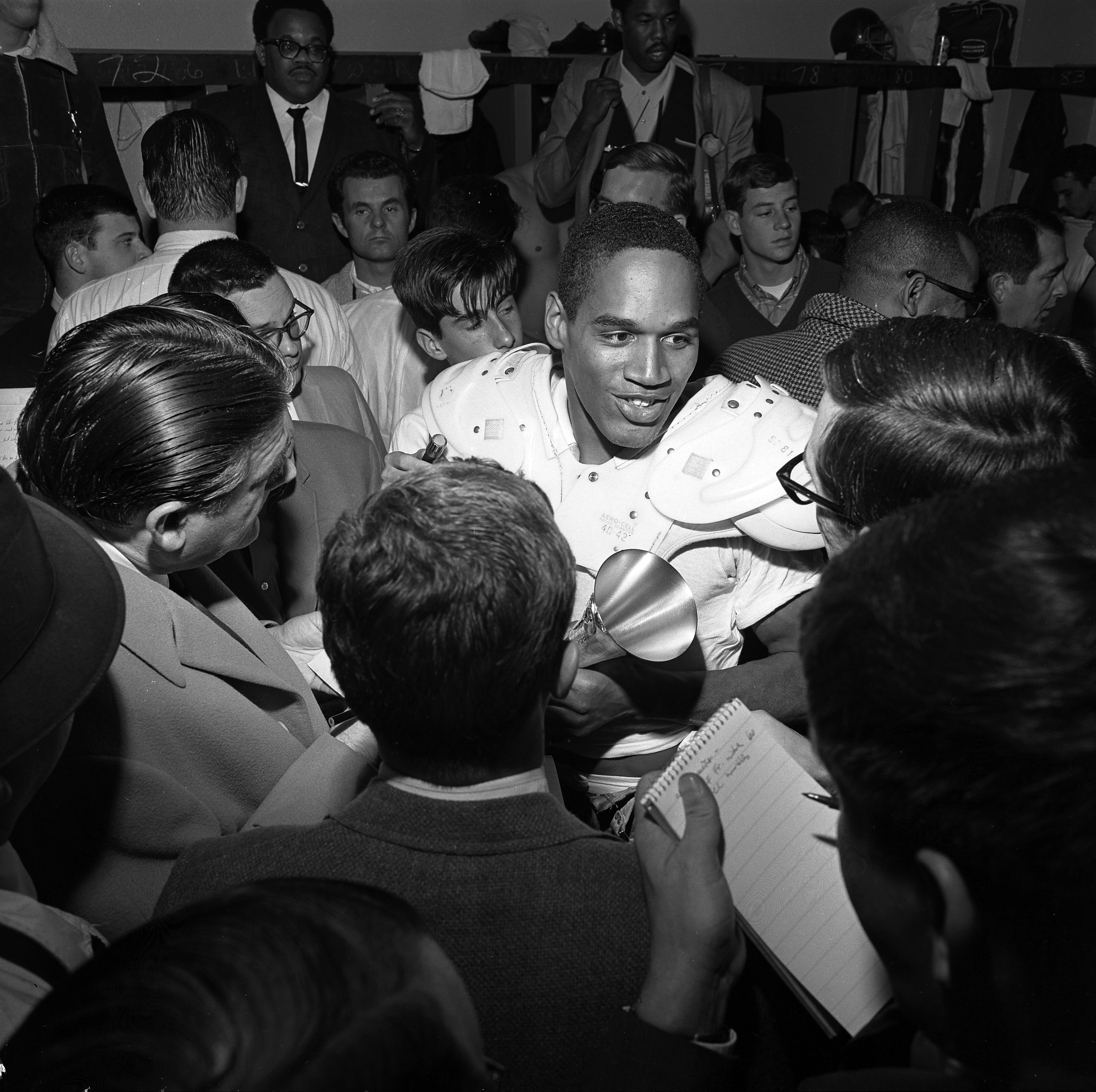
Simpson talking to reporters in 1967

As a senior in 1968, Simpson rushed for 1,709 yards and 22 touchdowns in the regular season, earning the Heisman Trophy, the Maxwell Award, and Walter Camp Award. He held the record for the Heisman's largest margin of victory for 51 years, defeating runner-up Leroy Keyes by 1,750 points. In the Rose Bowl on New Year's Day, No. 2 USC faced top-ranked Ohio State; Simpson ran for 171 yards, including an 80-yard touchdown run, in a 27–16 loss. Simpson's number 32 jersey was later retired by USC. Simpson had been a sociology student, but left USC without a degree.

== NFL career ==
=== Buffalo Bills ===
After finishing 1–12–1 in 1968, the AFL's Buffalo Bills held the first selection in the 1969 NFL/AFL draft. They took Simpson, but he demanded the largest contract in professional sports history: $650,000 over five years (equivalent to $4.4 million in 2025). This led to a standoff with Bills' owner, Ralph Wilson, as Simpson threatened to become an actor and skip professional football. Eventually, Wilson agreed to pay Simpson.

Simpson entered professional football with high expectations, but struggled in his first three years, averaging only 622 yards per season. Bills coach John Rauch, not wanting to build an offense around one running back, assigned Simpson to do blocking and receiving duties at the expense of running the ball. In 1971, Rauch resigned as head coach, and the Bills brought in Harvey Johnson. Despite Johnson devising a new offense for Simpson, Simpson was still ineffective that year. After the 1971 season, the Bills fired Johnson and brought in Lou Saban as head coach. Unlike Rauch, Saban made Simpson the centerpiece of the Bills offense.

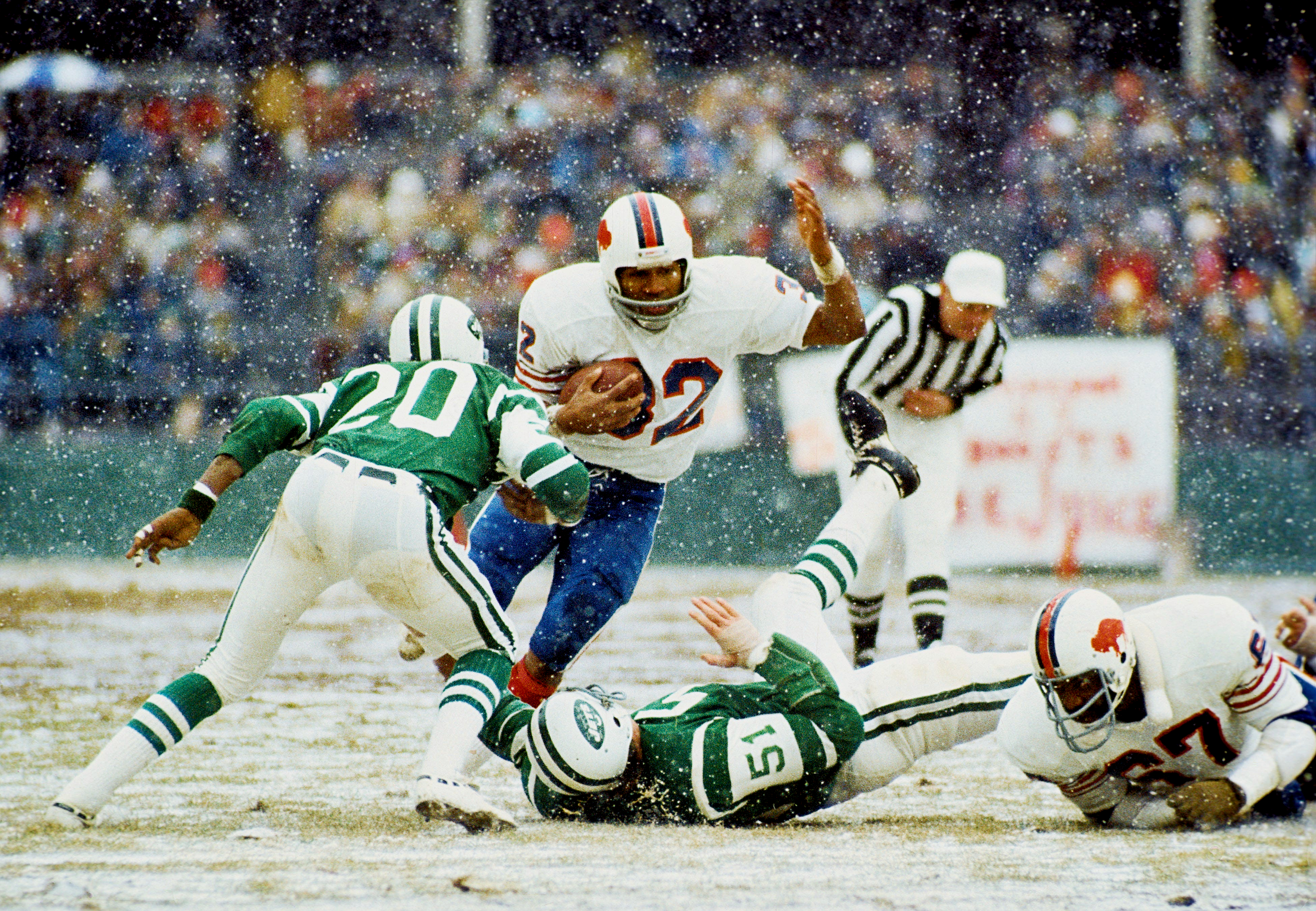
Simpson breaking the NFL's single-season rushing record in 1973

In 1972, Simpson rushed for over 1,000 yards for the first time in his career, gaining a league-leading total of 1,251 yards. In 1973, Simpson became the first player to break the highly coveted 2,000-yard rushing mark, with 2,003 total rushing yards and 12 touchdowns. Simpson broke the mark during the last game of the season against the New York Jets with a seven-yard rush. That same game also saw Simpson break Jim Brown's single-season rushing record of 1,863 yards. For his performance, Simpson won that year's NFL MVP Award and Bert Bell Award. He was also named The Sporting News Athlete of the Year, received the Hickok Belt as the top professional athlete of the year, and was selected as the Associated Press Athlete of the Year. While other players have broken the 2,000-yard mark since Simpson, his record was established when the NFL had only 14 games per season, as opposed to the 16-game seasons that began in 1978. In 2013, Simpson was reported still holding the rushing record for 14 games.

Simpson gained over 1,000 rushing yards in each of the next three seasons. He did not lead the league in rushing in 1974, but did cross the 1,000-yard barrier despite a knee injury. In game 11 of 1974, he passed Ken Willard as the rushing leader among active players, a position he maintained until his retirement more than five seasons later. Simpson also made his first and only playoff appearance during the 1974 season. In a divisional game against the Pittsburgh Steelers, Simpson rushed for 49 yards on 15 attempts and caught a touchdown pass, but the Bills lost the game 32–14. Simpson won the rushing title again in 1975, rushing for 1,817 yards and 16 touchdowns. He also had a career-high 426 receiving yards and seven receiving touchdowns that season.

Simpson again led the league in rushing in 1976, rushing for 1,503 yards and eight touchdowns. He had the best game of his career during that season's Thanksgiving game against the Detroit Lions on November 25. In that game, Simpson rushed for a then-record 273 yards on 29 attempts and scored two touchdowns. Despite Simpson's performance, the Bills lost the game 27–14.

A lowlight that season came during a game against the New England Patriots a few weeks earlier when defensive end Mel Lunsford and several other Patriots defenders stuffed the superstar running back for no gain. Still, as Simpson tried to continue driving forward, Lunsford body-slammed him to the ground. Simpson got up and punched Lunsford, which prompted Lunsford to swing back. Bills offensive lineman Reggie McKenzie then jumped on Lunsford's back. Still, Lunsford bent down and flung McKenzie over his head. He went back to swinging at Simpson before a melee of the two teams stopped the fight and ended up in a pile on the field. Lunsford and Simpson were ejected from the game as the Patriots' solid defense persisted, with New England winning 20–10 to finish the 1976 season 11–3. The Bills finished 2–12.

Simpson played only seven games in 1977 due to injury.

=== San Francisco 49ers ===
On March 28, 1978, prior to the 1978 season (the last year on his three-year contract that paid him $733,000), the Bills traded Simpson to his hometown San Francisco 49ers for five draft picks (2nd- and 3rd-round draft picks for 1978, a 1st- and 4th-round pick for 1979, and a 2nd-round pick for 1980); (Note: The Bills used these picks to draft Scott Hutchinson and Danny Fulton in 1978, Tom Cousineau and Ken Johnson in 1979, and Joe Cribbs in 1980. Cousineau elected to play in the CFL over playing in Buffalo, with the team later trading his rights for three draft picks in 1983, with one pick being used to draft Jim Kelly.) Simpson had tried to get the Bills to engineer a trade to the Los Angeles Rams prior to 1976 because he and his wife preferred the West Coast. The team previously had Delvin Williams and Wilbur Jackson in the backfield. Simpson played in San Francisco for two seasons, rushing for 1,053 yards and four touchdowns. Physical problems with his knees influenced him to retire from football. For his last home game at Candlestick Park, the 49ers held an "O.J. Simpson Day" at the stadium. His final NFL game was on December 16, 1979, a 31–21 loss to the Atlanta Falcons at Atlanta–Fulton County Stadium. His final play was a 10-yard run on 3rd and 10 for a first down.

=== Career summary ===
Simpson gained 11,236 rushing yards, placing him 2nd on the NFL's all-time rushing list when he retired; he now stands at 22nd. He was named NFL Player of the Year in 1973, and played in six Pro Bowls. He was the only player in NFL history to rush for over 2,000 yards in a 14-game season, and the only player to rush for over 200 yards in six different games in his career. From 1972 to 1976, Simpson averaged 1,540 rushing yards per 14-game season, 5.1 yards per carry, and he won the NFL rushing title four times. Simpson was inducted into the Pro Football Hall of Fame in 1985, his first year of eligibility. In 2019, he was named to the National Football League 100th Anniversary All-Time Team. Simpson also occasionally returned kickoffs during his early career, finishing with 33 returns for 990 yards and a touchdown, an average of 30 yards per return.

Simpson acquired the nickname "Juice" as a play on "O.J.", a common abbreviation for orange juice. "Juice" is also a colloquial synonym for electricity or electrical power, and hence a metaphor for any powerful entity; the Bills' offensive line at Simpson's peak was nicknamed "The Electric Company".

=== Postseason achievements ===
Simpson played in only one playoff game during his 11-season Hall of Fame career: a 1974 Divisional Round game between the Buffalo Bills and the Pittsburgh Steelers. Simpson was held to 49 rushing yards on fifteen carries to go with three receptions for 37 yards and a touchdown as the Bills lost 32–14. Indeed, 1974 would be one of only three winning seasons the Bills would tally in Simpson's nine years with the team.

=== Other activities during NFL career ===
In 1975, Simpson competed on the television series Superstars, and was the season's winner. He received $39,250 in prize money. Following the example of the previous season's winner (Kyle Rote Jr.), Simpson donated $5,000 of his prize money to the Special Olympics.

== Career statistics ==
| | AP NFL MVP & OPOTY |
| | NFL record |
| | Led the league |
| **Bold** | Career high |

=== NFL ===
==== Regular season ====
| Year | Team | Games | | Rushing | | | | | | | Receiving | | | | | | | Kickoff returns | | | | | Fum |
| Year | Team | GP | GS | Att | Yds | Avg | Lng | TD | Y/G | A/G | Rec | Yds | Avg | Lng | TD | Y/G | R/G | Ret | Yds | Avg | Lng | TD | Fum |
|---|---|---|---|---|---|---|---|---|---|---|---|---|---|---|---|---|---|---|---|---|---|---|---|
| 1969 | BUF | 13 | 0 | 181 | 697 | 3.9 | 32 | 2 | 53.6 | 13.9 | **30** | 343 | 11.4 | 55 | 3 | 26.4 | **2.3** | **21** | **529** | 25.2 | 73 | 0 | 6 |
| 1970 | BUF | 8 | 8 | 120 | 488 | 4.1 | 56 | 5 | 61.0 | 15.0 | 10 | 139 | 13.9 | 36 | 0 | 17.4 | 1.3 | 7 | 333 | **47.6** | **95** | **1** | 6 |
| 1971 | BUF | 14 | 14 | 183 | 742 | 4.1 | 46 | 5 | 53.0 | 13.1 | 21 | 162 | 7.7 | 38 | 0 | 11.6 | 1.5 | 4 | 107 | 26.8 | 43 | 0 | 5 |
| 1972 | BUF | 14 | 14 | 292 | 1,251 | 4.3 | **94** | 6 | 89.4 | 20.9 | 27 | 198 | 7.3 | 25 | 0 | 14.1 | 1.9 | 1 | 21 | 21.0 | 21 | 0 | **8** |
| 1973 | BUF | 14 | 14 | **332** | **2,003** | **6.0** | 80 | 12 | **143.1** | **23.7** | 6 | 70 | 11.7 | 24 | 0 | 5.0 | 0.4 | – | – | – | – | – | 7 |
| 1974 | BUF | 14 | 14 | 270 | 1,125 | 4.2 | 41 | 3 | 80.4 | 19.3 | 15 | 189 | 12.6 | 29 | 1 | 13.5 | 1.1 | – | – | – | – | – | 7 |
| 1975 | BUF | 14 | 14 | 329 | 1,817 | 5.5 | 88 | **16** | 129.8 | 23.5 | 28 | **426** | **15.2** | **64** | **7** | **30.4** | 2.0 | – | – | – | – | – | 7 |
| 1976 | BUF | 14 | 13 | 290 | 1,503 | 5.2 | 75 | 8 | 107.4 | 20.7 | 22 | 259 | 11.8 | 43 | 1 | 18.5 | 1.6 | – | – | – | – | – | 6 |
| 1977 | BUF | 7 | 7 | 126 | 557 | 4.4 | 39 | 0 | 79.6 | 18.0 | 16 | 138 | 8.6 | 18 | 0 | 19.7 | **2.3** | – | – | – | – | – | 2 |
| 1978 | SF | 10 | 10 | 161 | 593 | 3.7 | 34 | 1 | 59.3 | 16.1 | 21 | 172 | 8.2 | 19 | 2 | 17.2 | 2.1 | – | – | – | – | – | 5 |
| 1979 | SF | 13 | 8 | 120 | 460 | 3.8 | 22 | 3 | 35.4 | 9.2 | 7 | 46 | 6.6 | 14 | 0 | 3.5 | 0.5 | – | – | – | – | – | 3 |
| Career | | 135 | 116 | 2,404 | 11,236 | 4.7 | 94 | 61 | 83.2 | 17.8 | 203 | 2,142 | 10.6 | 64 | 14 | 15.9 | 1.5 | 33 | 990 | 30.0 | 95 | 1 | 62 |

==== Postseason ====
| Year | Team | Games | | Rushing | | | | | | | Receiving | | | | | | | Fum |
| Year | Team | GP | GS | Att | Yds | Avg | Lng | TD | Y/G | A/G | Rec | Yds | Avg | Lng | TD | Y/G | R/G | Fum |
|---|---|---|---|---|---|---|---|---|---|---|---|---|---|---|---|---|---|---|
| 1974 | BUF | 1 | 1 | 15 | 49 | 3.3 | 11 | 0 | 49.0 | 15.0 | 3 | 37 | 12.3 | 25 | 1 | 37.0 | 3.0 | 0 |

=== College ===
| Season | Team | Rushing | | | | Receiving | | | |
| Season | Team | Att | Yds | Avg | TD | Rec | Yds | Avg | TD |
|---|---|---|---|---|---|---|---|---|---|
| 1967 | USC | 291 | 1,543 | **5.3** | 13 | 10 | 109 | **10.9** | 0 |
| 1968 | USC | **383** | **1,880** | 4.9 | **23** | **26** | **211** | 8.1 | 0 |
| Totals | | 674 | 3,423 | 5.1 | 36 | 36 | 320 | 8.9 | 0 |

== Career highlights ==
=== Awards and honors ===
NFL

- NFL Most Valuable Player (1973)
- NFL Offensive Player of the Year (1973)
- 5× First-team All-Pro (1972–1976)
- 5× Pro Bowl (1972–1976)
- Pro Bowl MVP (1972)
- AFL All-Star (1969)
- AP Athlete of the Year (1973)
- SN Athlete of the Year (1973)
- Hickok Belt (1973)
- 3× UPI AFC Offensive Player of the Year (1972, 1973, 1975)
- 4× NFL rushing yards leader (1972, 1973, 1975, 1976)
- 2× NFL rushing touchdowns leader (1973, 1975)
- NFL scoring leader (1975)
- NFL 1970s All-Decade Team
- NFL 75th Anniversary All-Time Team
- NFL 100th Anniversary All-Time Team
- No. 40 on The Top 100: NFL's Greatest Players
- Buffalo Bills Wall of Fame

College

- National champion (1967)
- Heisman Trophy (1968)
- Maxwell Award (1968)
- 2× Walter Camp Award (1967, 1968)
- 2× UPI Player of the Year (1967, 1968)
- SN Player of the Year (1968)
- Chic Harley Award (1968)
- 2× Unanimous All-American (1967, 1968)
- 2× NCAA rushing yards leader (1967, 1968)
- NCAA rushing touchdowns leader (1968)
- NCAA scoring leader (1968)
- W. J. Voit Memorial Trophy (1968)
- Pop Warner Trophy (1968)
- 2× First-team All-Pac-8 (1967, 1968)
- USC Trojans No. 32 retired

Junior college

- NJCAA All-American (1966)

=== NFL records ===
- Fastest player to gain 1,000 rushing yards in a season: 1,025 in seven games in 1973 and 1,005 in seven games in 1975 (tied with Terrell Davis).
- Fastest player to gain 2,000 rushing yards in a season: 2,003 in 14 games in 1973.
- Most rushing yards per game in a season: 143.1 per game in 1973.

== Acting career ==
=== 1960s and 1970s ===
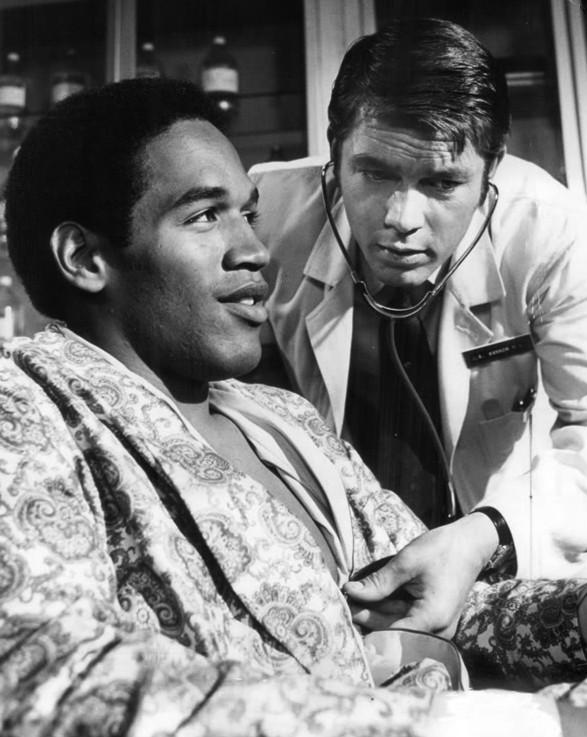
Simpson appearing on an episode of Medical Center in 1969

Simpson began acting while at USC and appeared on Dragnet in an uncredited role as a potential recruit to the Los Angeles Police Department (LAPD). He became a professional actor before playing professional football, appearing in the first episode of Medical Center—as Cicely Tyson's husband despite being 23 years her junior—while negotiating his contract with the Bills.

Sportswriter Ralph Wiley wrote in 2002 that before Simpson's murder trial, white people considered Simpson a "unifying symbol of all races". History professor Lou Moore said that this made Simpson the first Black athlete to be "put on". In 1975, People magazine described Simpson as "the first [Black] athlete to become a bona fide lovable media superstar". Simpson avoided starring in blaxploitation films, choosing third or fourth lead roles while studying experienced stars like Lee Marvin and Richard Burton. His Hertz commercials from 1975 benefited Simpson's acting career, but he sometimes intentionally chose non-positive roles; "I've got to tear down that picture of O.J. Simpson, the clean-cut athlete, to get believability into whatever part I happen to be playing." He said in 1980 that "The Oscar or the Emmy says you've reached a level of competence in this business, and I would love to have one."

While in the NFL, Simpson appeared in productions such as the television miniseries Roots (1977), and the dramatic motion pictures The Klansman (1974), The Towering Inferno (1974), The Cassandra Crossing (1977), and Capricorn One (1978). In 1979, he started his own film production company, Orenthal Productions, which dealt mostly in made-for-TV fare such as the family-oriented Goldie and the Boxer films with Melissa Michaelsen (1979 and 1981). Simpson said that he did not seriously consider an acting career until seeing Marvin and Burton, while filming The Klansman in California, ordering chili from Chasen's via a private jet. Simpson appeared in the audience of NBC's Saturday Night Live during its second season and hosted an episode during its third season. He was the second professional athlete to host the show.

=== 1980s ===
In 1987, Simpson also made a cameo in the comedy Back to the Beach. He played Det. Nordberg in all three entries of The Naked Gun film trilogy (1988, 1991, 1994) alongside Leslie Nielsen, Priscilla Presley, and George Kennedy. Nordberg would get injured in a continuous series of gags.

According to Arnold Schwarzenegger, Simpson was considered by director James Cameron to play the eponymous character in The Terminator (1984) when Schwarzenegger was cast as the character Kyle Reese, but Cameron ultimately cast Schwarzenegger as the Terminator, while Simpson had no involvement in the film. The film's producers felt Simpson was "too nice" to be seen as a killer like the Terminator.

=== 1990s ===
Simpson starred in the untelevised two-hour-long film pilot for Frogmen, an A-Team-like adventure series that Warner Bros. Television completed in 1994, a few months before the two murders he was accused of. Simpson played John "Bullfrog" Burke, the leader of a group of former United States Navy SEALs who operated out of a surf shop in Malibu. NBC had not yet decided whether to order the series when Simpson's arrest canceled the project. NBC executive Preston Beckman collected each copy of Frogmen to ensure that no copy leaked to the media. While searching his home, the police obtained a videotaped copy of the pilot as well as the script and dailies. Although the prosecution investigated reports that Simpson received "a fair amount of" military training—including use of a knife—for Frogmen, and there is a scene in which he holds a knife to the throat of a woman, this material was not introduced as evidence during the trial.

NBC executive Warren Littlefield said in July 1994 that the network would probably never air the pilot if Simpson were convicted. Most pilots that are two hours long are aired as TV movies whether or not they are ordered as series. Because—as the Los Angeles Times later reported—"the appetite for all things O.J. appeared insatiable" during the trial, Warner Bros. and NBC estimated that a gigantic, Super Bowl–like television audience would have watched the Frogmen film. In 2000, co-star Evan Handler – who would later go on to portray "Dream Team" member Alan Dershowitz in The People v. O. J. Simpson: American Crime Story – told the Los Angeles Times the studio's decision not to air it or release it on home video and forgo an estimated $14 million in profits, was "just about the only proof you have that there is some dignity in the advertising and television business."

=== 2000s ===
In 2006, Simpson starred in his own improv-based hidden-camera prank TV show, Juiced. Typical of the genre, Simpson would play a prank on everyday people while secretly filming them. At the end of each prank, he would shout, "You've been Juiced!" Each episode opened with half-dressed models dancing around Simpson, who is dressed as a pimp and performs his own rap song. In one episode, Simpson is at a used car lot in Las Vegas, where he attempts to sell a white Ford Bronco (the SUV model that became infamous during his 1994 police chase). A bullet hole in the front of the SUV is circled with his autograph, and he pitches it to a prospective buyer by saying that if they "ever get into some trouble and have to get away, it has escapability." In another sketch, Simpson pretends to be having an affair with another man's girlfriend. Later, he transforms into an old white man whose dying wish is to call a game of bingo. Juiced aired as a one-time special on pay-per-view television and was later released on DVD.

== Broadcasting career ==
Simpson worked as an NFL analyst on NBC from 1978 to 1982. He joined ABC's Monday Night Football crew in 1983, becoming the first black announcer on the network's No. 1 NFL broadcast team. For Super Bowl XIX during the 1984 season, ABC moved Simpson to its pregame show, replacing him in the broadcast booth with active player Joe Theismann, who had played in the previous two Super Bowls. Simpson continued his Monday Night Football announcing duties in 1985 before being dropped after the season. In 1989, he rejoined NBC to replace Ahmad Rashad as an analyst on their NFL Live! pregame show. After he was accused of his ex-wife's murder, Simpson was replaced by Rashad in 1994.

== Endorsements ==
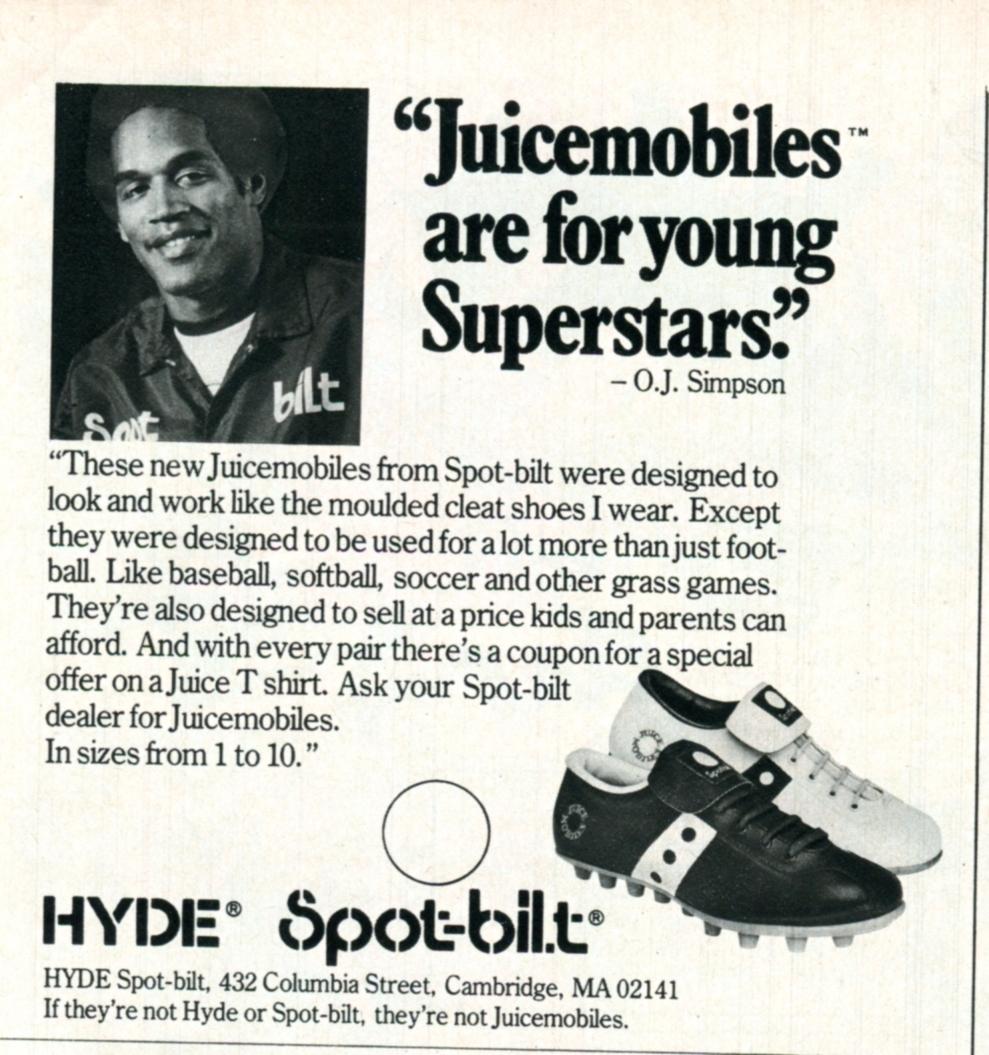
Simpson in a 1976 advertisement for Spot-Bilt shoes

Chuck Barnes helped Simpson form business relationships with Chevrolet and ABC early in his football career. By 1971, the magazine New York wrote that Simpson was already wealthy enough to "retire this week if [he] wanted to." Beginning in 1975, he appeared in advertisements with the Hertz rental car company. Commercials depicted Simpson running through airports (embodying speed), as others shouted to him the Hertz slogan "Go, O.J., Go!" He was the first Black man to be hired for a major corporate national advertising campaign, a unique decision for a conservative, dominant corporation to fend off its rival, No. 2 Avis. Besides helping his acting career, Simpson estimated that the very successful "superstar in rent-a-car" campaign raised the recognition rate among people he met from 30% to 90%. Hertz's annual profit increased by 50% to $42.2 million within the first year, brand awareness increased by more than 40%, and 97% of viewers understood that the commercials advertised Hertz, avoiding the common "vampire video" problem of viewers remembering an ad, but not which brand it promotes. Simpson was so important to the company that CEO Frank Olson personally negotiated his contract, and Hertz used him for an unusually long time for a celebrity endorser. Although Simpson appeared less often in Hertz commercials by the late 1980s, his relationship with the company continued; Simpson was to travel to Chicago to meet with Hertz executives and clients on the night of the Brown-Goldman murder.

Simpson used his amiable persona, good looks, and charisma in many endorsement deals. Advertising Age in 1977 named Simpson the magazine's Star Presenter of the Year; by 1984, consumer research found that he was the most popular athlete endorser. A 1990s MCI Communications commercial starring Eunice Simpson satirized her son's work. Other products Simpson endorsed included Pioneer Chicken, Honey Baked Ham, TreeSweet orange juice, Calistoga Water Company's line of Napa Naturals soft drinks, and Dingo cowboy boots. As president and CEO of O. J. Simpson Enterprises, he owned hotels and restaurants. When Simpson and Brown divorced in 1992, he had $10 million in assets and more than $1 million in annual income, including $550,000 from Hertz.

== Marriages to Marguerite Whitley and Nicole Brown ==
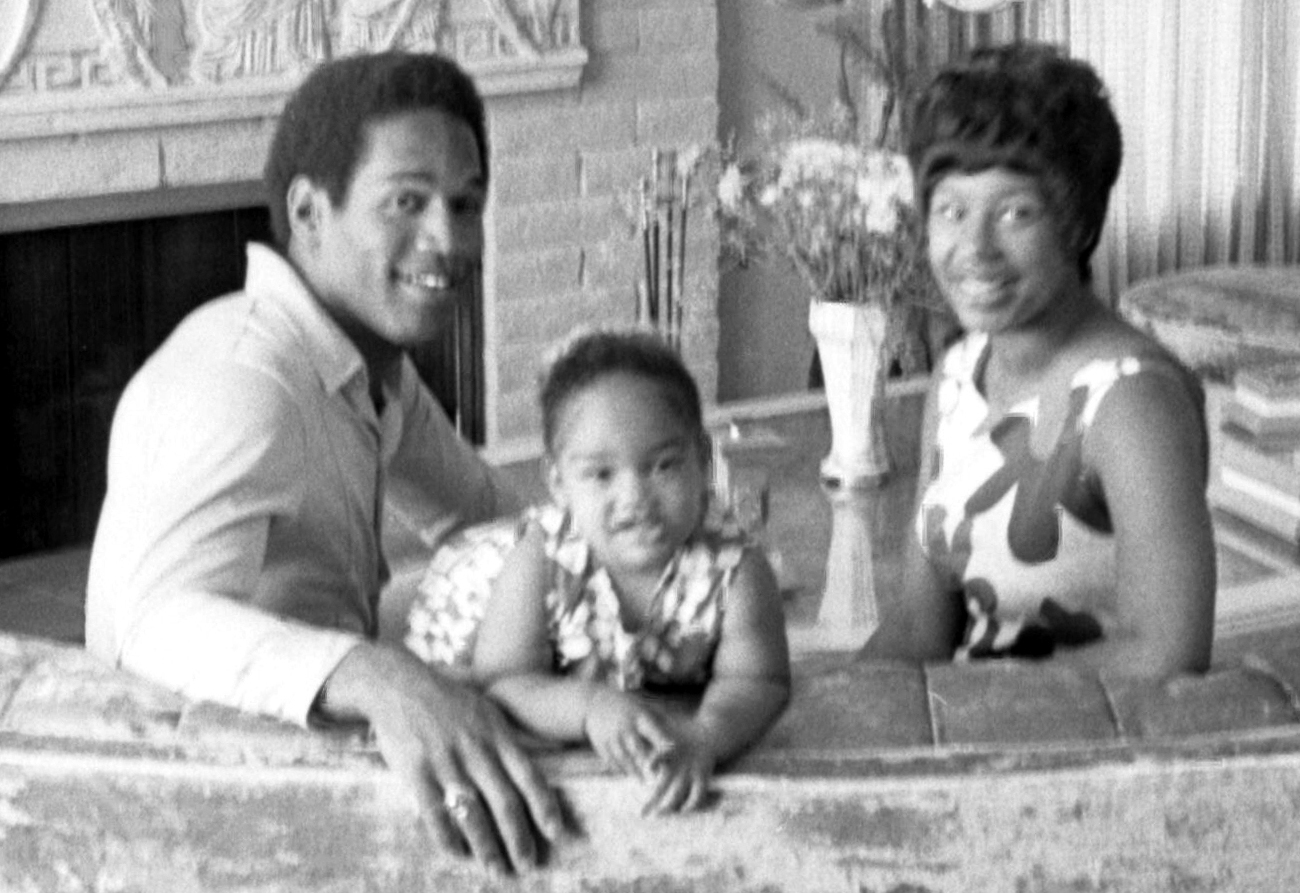
Simpson, Marguerite Whitley, and their daughter Arnelle at their home in Bel-Air, Los Angeles, in 1970

On June 24, 1967, Simpson married Marguerite L. Whitley. Together, they had three children: Arnelle L. Simpson (b. 1968), Jason Lamar Simpson (b. 1970), and Aaren Lashone Simpson (1977–1979). In August 1979, Aaren fatally drowned in the family's swimming pool.

Marguerite declined to testify at the trial on Simpson's behalf. According to LAPD Officer Terry Schauer and his partner Richard Deandra, when she and Simpson were married, they got a call from Marguerite, who alleged that Simpson was physically violent towards her. She refused to press charges against him. In an interview with Barbara Walters in 1995, Marguerite denied allegations that a police officer responded to a domestic violence call during her marriage to Simpson, telling Walters the alleged incident was not true and that she never made a police report. "Never—never did. I just found out about this, after 21 years." Marguerite addressed rumors that she was a battered woman during her marriage to Simpson, stating, "If he did, he would have got a frying pan upside his head. There was just no way that I would allow that to happen to me." She also expressed her belief in Simpson's innocence and denied rumors that their son Jason helped commit the murders. "Oh God, it's not something O.J. would do. It's not—you know, it's just not something either one of them would do," she said.

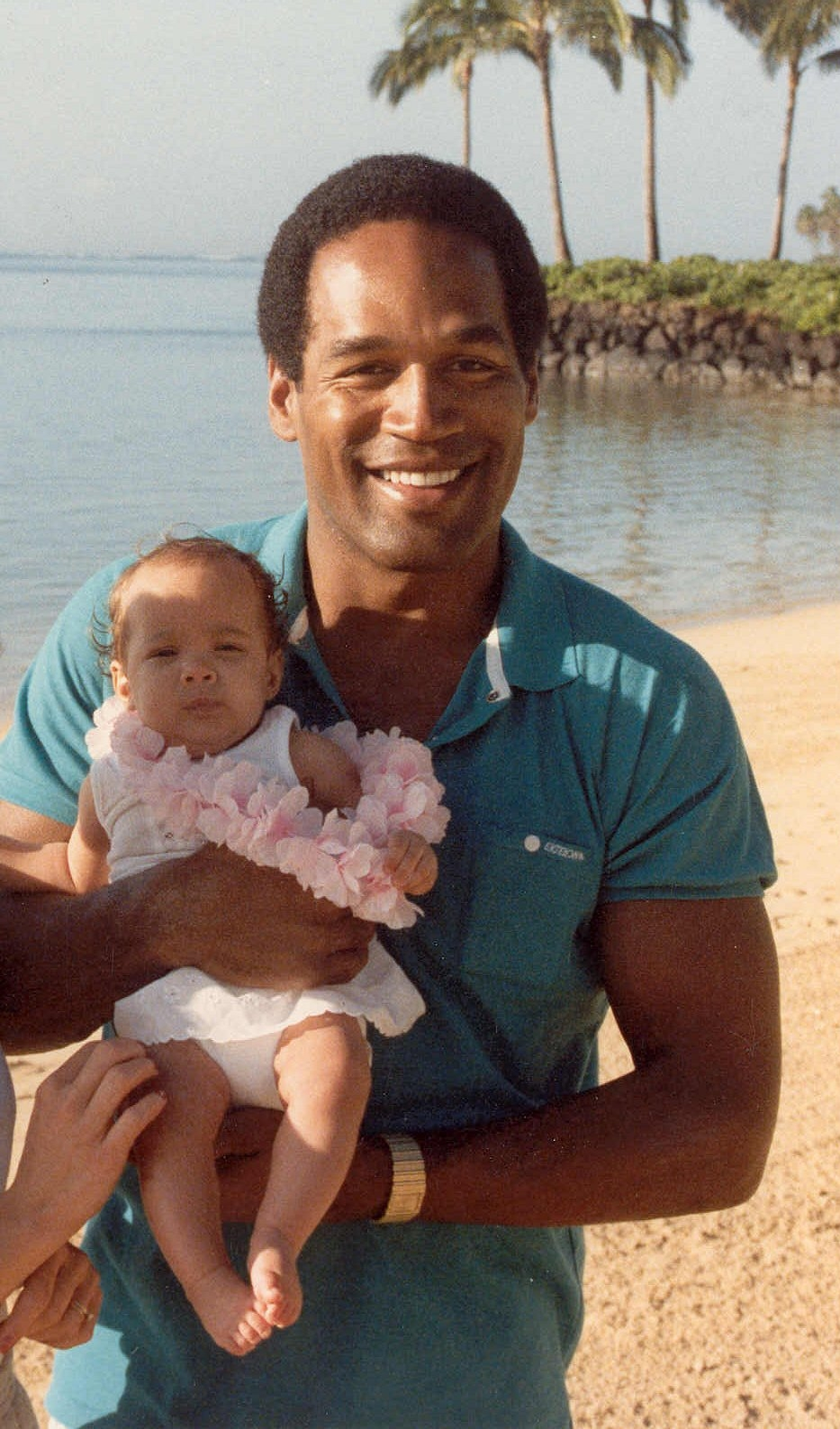
Simpson with his daughter, Sydney Brooke, in Hawaii in 1986

Simpson met Nicole Brown in 1977 while she was working as a waitress at a Beverly Hills nightclub called The Daisy. Although still married to his first wife, Simpson began dating Brown. Simpson and Marguerite divorced in March 1979. During the 1984 Summer Olympics torch relay, Simpson carried the torch on Santa Monica's California Incline road, running behind Brown. Brown and Simpson were married on February 2, 1985, five years after his retirement from professional football. The couple had two children, Sydney Brooke Simpson (b. 1985) and Justin Ryan Simpson (b. 1988). The marriage lasted seven years.

According to Sheila Weller, "[Simpson and Brown] were a dramatic, fractious, mutually obsessed couple before they married, after they married, after they divorced in 1992, and after they reconciled." In the June 3, 2024, edition of People, Brown's sister Denise stated that Simpson was at times volatile to Brown early into their relationship, including on one occasion in 1977 where he "flipped out" and "had her upstairs in the bathroom crying. He said, 'You embarrassed me.'" after seeing Nicole kiss a mutual male friend on the cheek after she and her family went to upstate New York to attend a Buffalo Bills game that Simpson was playing in.

Brown claimed that by the end of 1989, police had visited her and Simpson's house eight times for domestic violence calls, and they did not help her in any of them. On December 31, she phoned the police, saying that she thought he was going to kill her. She was found by officers hiding in the bushes outside their home, "badly beaten and half-naked." Authorities said Simpson had "punched, slapped, and kicked" her. Simpson sped away from the officers in his car, but eventually he pleaded no contest to spousal abuse. Simpson was given two years' probation, 120 hours of community service, and he had to donate $500 to a battered women's shelter. Brown filed for divorce on February 25, 1992, citing irreconcilable differences. This was after finding out about an alleged year-long affair Simpson had had with model Tawny Kitaen.

Reports suggest that in 1993, Brown and Simpson made an attempt at reconciliation. That October, Brown called the police to report Simpson being violent again after he allegedly found a photo of a man Brown had dated while they were broken up. Again, officers intervened. A family friend claimed that Simpson had told Brown's friends that if he ever "caught her with anyone, he would kill her." Brown's friend Kris Jenner claimed Brown at one point told her, "Things are really bad between O.J. and I, and he's going to kill me, and he's going to get away with it." The two broke up again, seemingly permanently, in May 1994. According to Brown's sister Tanya, on the night she was murdered, Nicole told their mother Juditha while dining out together at the Mezzaluna restaurant that Simpson would always be her soulmate. In total, prosecutors for Simpson's murder trial found 62 incidents of abusive behavior by Simpson towards Brown. News reporting regarding these incidents led to California enforcing its 1986 laws protecting domestic violence victims more. Hertz continued to air its commercials with Simpson.

In a 1996 book, former maid Bethy Vaquerano alleged that Brown was racist and had been physically abusive towards Simpson. In a 1997 book, Simpson's niece Terri Baker said Brown could be very insulting to people when she was angry and that she observed Brown insulting and slapping Simpson in the past.

== Legal history ==
=== 1994 arrest for the murder of Nicole Brown Simpson and Ron Goldman ===
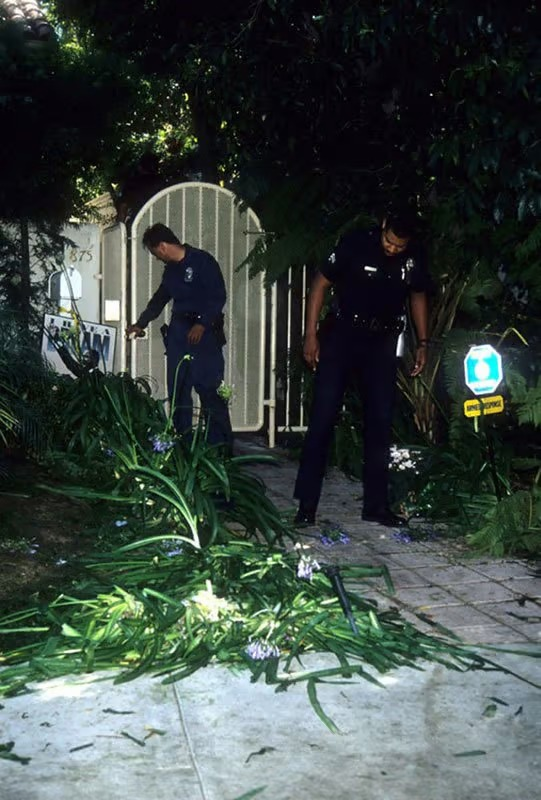
Police officers searching Nicole Brown Simpson's condo for evidence in June 1994

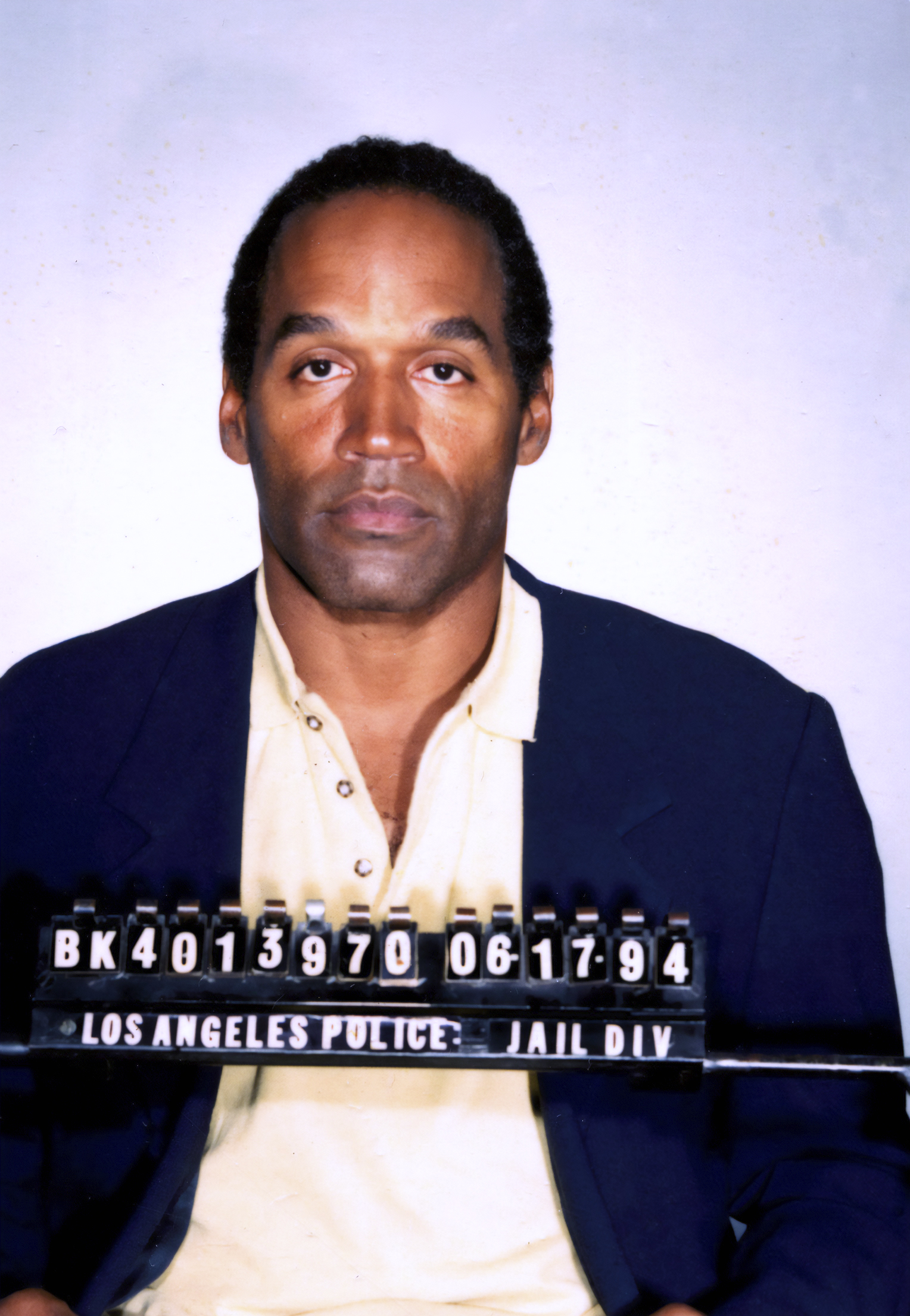
O.J. Simpson's mug shot, June 17, 1994

Shortly after midnight on June 13, 1994, Nicole Brown and her friend, Ron Goldman, were found stabbed to death in the courtyard outside Brown's condo, in the Brentwood neighborhood of Los Angeles. Police determined the murders had taken place on the night of the 12th. Goldman had been there to return to Brown a pair of glasses that her mother had lost earlier that day. The knife used was never found. Simpson was an immediate person of interest in their murders, and there was never any other suspect found. He maintained that on the 12th, he had been at home, waiting for a limousine to take him to an airport for a flight to Chicago. After police gathered all the evidence, charges were filed and a warrant was signed for Simpson's arrest.

Simpson, in agreement with his attorneys, was scheduled to turn himself in at approximately 11:00 a.m. to the Parker Center police headquarters on the morning of June 17. Simpson failed to turn himself in, and he later became the subject of a low-speed pursuit (on the 405 Freeway) by police while riding as a passenger in a white 1993 Ford Bronco SUV, a vehicle owned and being driven by his former teammate and longtime friend Al Cowlings. According to Cowlings, Simpson was armed in the back of the vehicle with a pistol, holding it to his head and threatening to shoot himself if he was not taken back to his Brentwood estate. This caused the responding California Highway Patrol officers to pursue with extreme caution.

The white Ford Bronco XLT that Al Cowlings drove in the O.J. Simpson police pursuit, on display at the Alcatraz East museum

Police closed the nearby highways. At one point, Simpson tried to call sportscaster Bob Costas, with whom he had worked before and had a good relationship, but was unable to reach him. As Cowlings drove, Simpson's lawyer Robert Kardashian publicly released a letter from him, saying: "Don't feel sorry for me ... I've had a great life, great friends. Please think of the real O.J. and not this lost person." The Bronco ride lasted more than 2 hours, until 8 pm, when Simpson and Cowlings arrived at Simpson's Brentwood home, and negotiations for surrender began. He was arrested shortly before 9 pm.

The chase was shown on "nearly every live television station." Stations interrupted coverage of the 1994 NBA Finals to broadcast the incident live. With an estimated audience of 95 million people, the event was described as "the most famous ride on American shores since Paul Revere's." Tens of thousands of people gathered on Los Angeles streets and highways to view the chase. The incident likely increased sales of the Ford Bronco by an additional 7,000 purchases in 1994 compared to 1993.

Many advocates for victims of domestic violence consider Brown's death instrumental in Congress prioritizing the passage of the Violence Against Women Act. The act, passed in September 1994, created the National Domestic Violence Hotline.

=== 1995 criminal trial for murder ===
==== Background ====
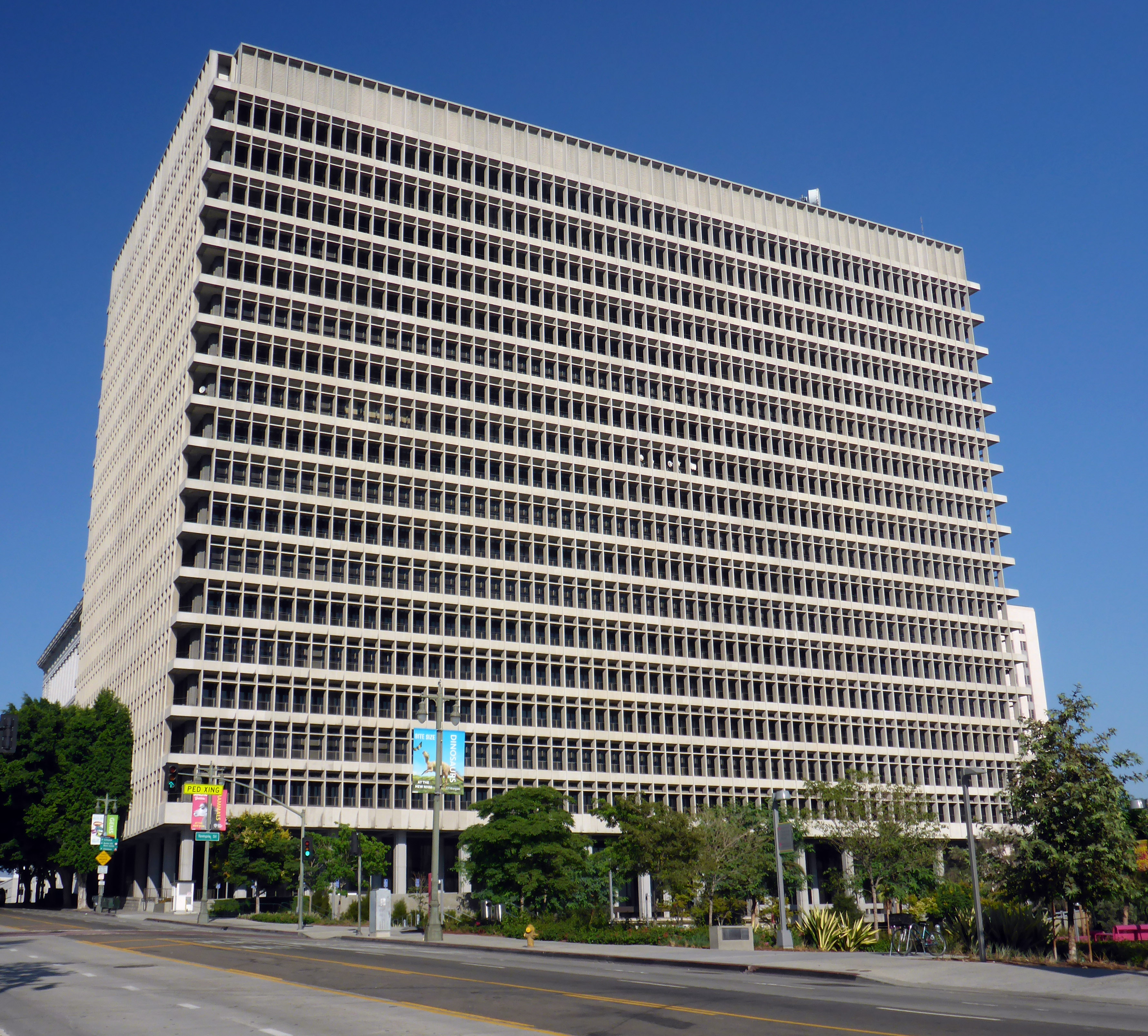
The Clara Shortridge Foltz Criminal Justice Center, where the trial took place

The pursuit, arrest, and trial of Simpson were among the most widely publicized events in American history. Simpson's integrated defense counsel team, named the "Dream Team", included Kardashian, Johnnie Cochran, Robert Shapiro, F. Lee Bailey, and Alan Dershowitz. The prosecution for the State of California was led by Marcia Clark and Christopher A. Darden. The judge was Lance Ito. The trial ran from January to October 1995, making it the longest trial in California history. The jury sequestered for 266 days, also the longest in California history. It ended up including 10 Black people on a 12-person jury.

The trial was often characterized as the "trial of the century" because of its international publicity, likened to that of Sacco and Vanzetti and the Lindbergh kidnapping. It was televised via a remote-control camera installed above the jury box, and it increased public interest in reality television and understanding of DNA evidence. It influenced the creation of the LAPD's DNA crime lab, and California added Section 1109 to the state's Evidence Code, "allowing uncharged conduct and other evidence of prior abuse to be shown to jurors in similar cases." Minor figures in the trial became celebrities, such as the resident of Simpson's guesthouse at the time of the murders, Kato Kaelin.

In 1995, while waiting to appear before a jury for his trial hearing, Simpson published the book I Want to Tell You: My Response to Your Letters, Your Messages, Your Questions, which was intended to be a "self-portrait of [his] mind at this critical time", and included letters he had received while incarcerated. It was produced with Lawrence Schiller.

==== Prosecution and defense cases ====
Before the trial began, it was discovered the police investigation had been flawed: "Photo evidence had been lost or mislabeled; DNA had been collected and stored improperly, raising a possibility that it was tainted."

Prosecutors provided DNA evidence, including both victims' blood found in Simpson's car and Brown's blood found on Simpson's socks. Hair and clothing fibers consistent with Simpson, Brown, and Goldman, as well as fibers from a 1993–94 Ford Bronco and Brown's dog, were found on a black leather glove recovered from Simpson's home. The other glove in the pair was found at Brown's condo. The defense claimed that the glove found at Brown's condo did not fit Simpson's hand. In response, prosecutors theorized that Simpson had not been taking anti-inflammatory medications for his arthritis, which would make his hand swell if he tried to put on the glove during the trial. Johnnie Cochran informed Judge Ito the next day that Shawn Chapman contacted the Los Angeles County Jail doctor, who confirmed Simpson was taking his arthritis medication every day, and that the jail's medical records verified this. Cochran claimed during the defense's closing argument, "If the glove don't fit, you must acquit." The phrase became famous in popular culture. Prosecutors also raised concerns that the glove would have shrunk because it had been soaked in blood and repeatedly frozen and thawed before the trial. Cochran denied this claim. When Simpson tried the glove on in court, he struggled to put it on. People magazine wrote that the moment was crucial to his eventual acquittal. Richard Rubin, vice president of the gloves' manufacturer, Aris Isotoner Inc., testified that a new pair of gloves of the same model would have fit Simpson.

The trial came in the context of multiple incidents involving the Los Angeles criminal justice system in the previous years. In 1991, Latasha Harlins, a 15-year-old Black girl, was shot in the head by store owner Soon Ja Du, who accused her of stealing a bottle of orange juice. A jury convicted Du of voluntary manslaughter, but a judge only sentenced her to probation. Also in 1991, four police officers allegedly beat Rodney King, a Black man; in 1992, all of the officers were acquitted. These incidents led to the 1992 Los Angeles riots.

The defense alleged that the crime scene had been compromised, and presented audiotape recordings of Mark Fuhrman, an officer who was at the scene and collected evidence, repeatedly using the racial slur "nigger" in an interview with an aspiring screenwriter. Fuhrman was later charged with perjury for lying about not saying the slur, and pleaded no contest. This added to the popular perception that LAPD officers were racist, which worked against the police reforms being made by the city of Los Angeles since the beating of Rodney King.

The trial created a public discourse on race relations, motivated by Bailey and Cochran's cross-examination of Fuhrman over the tapes. It "divided the nation" along racial lines; white people were more likely to believe in Simpson's guilt, while Black people were more likely to believe in his innocence. Many believed Simpson was being set up by the police, taking into consideration the LAPD's history of corruption, the acquittal of the officers who beat Rodney King, and that Fuhrman, who found the glove at Simpson's home, entered the home without a search warrant. The defense argued that Fuhrman had planted the glove. MSNBC's Charles F. Coleman Jr. wrote in 2024 that "Black people didn't love O.J. Simpson, they hated the LAPD." Jim Newton wrote for the Los Angeles Times that "the effect [of the defense's focus on Fuhrman] on the jury was inescapable."

"On the evidence that they gave me to evaluate, it was crooked by the cops," juror David Aldana said in an interview. "The evidence given to me to look at, I could not convict. Did he do it? Maybe, maybe not." Juror Sheila Woods denied the jury's decision was based on race in an interview with Vulture. When asked if she believed Simpson was framed, Woods responded, "I don't know if he was necessarily framed. I think O.J. may know something about what happened, but I just don't think he did it. I think it was more than one person, just because of the way she was killed." She further stated:

I don't know how he could have just left that bloody scene — because it was bloody — and got back into his Bronco and not have it filled with blood. And then go back home and go in the front door, up the stairs to his bedroom … That carpet was snow white in his house. He should have blood all over him or bruises because Ron Goldman was definitely fighting for his life. He had defensive cuts on his shoes and on his hands. O.J. only had that little cut on his finger. If [Goldman] was kicking to death, you would think that the killer would have gotten some bruises on his body. They showed us photos of O.J. with just his underwear just two days after, and he had no bruises or anything on his body.

In an interview with CNN following Simpson's death, juror Yolanda Adams said she was still comfortable with her decision to render a not guilty verdict and denied the verdict was based on payback for Rodney King, citing the reasonable doubt in the case presented by the defense and the actions of the police officers involved in the case, such as Mark Fuhrman pleading the Fifth when he was asked if he planted or manufactured any evidence against Simpson.

==== Verdict and aftermath ====
The New York Times wrote that "in the end, it was the defense that had the overwhelming case, with many grounds for reasonable doubt, the standard for acquittal." The trial culminated after 11 months on October 3, 1995, when the jury rendered a verdict of "not guilty" for the two murders. Around 100 to 150 million people nationwide tuned in to watch or listen to the verdict announcement. The jury deliberation lasted three hours. By the end, the trial produced "126 witnesses, 1,105 items of evidence and 45,000 pages of transcripts." Simpson was released after 474 days in custody.

Immediate reaction to the verdict was known for its division along racial lines: a poll of Los Angeles County residents showed that most African Americans there felt justice had been served by the verdict, while the majority of whites and Latinos opined that it had not. NBC News wrote that "Black residents in parts of Los Angeles spilled out onto the street, cheering and passing celebratory drinks", and that similar scenes happened across the country. In 1994, 22% of Black respondents to a poll believed Simpson was guilty, as opposed to 63% of white people. A 2016 poll showed that 57% of Black Americans and 83% of white Americans believed Simpson was guilty. This change was partially caused by the verdict of Simpson's later civil trial.

At various points after the acquittal, the portion of a mural in Potrero Hill that featured Simpson in his 49ers uniform was vandalized with splashes of red paint and devil horns painted on his head; he was eventually painted out of the mural.

Following Simpson's acquittal, no additional arrests or convictions related to the murders were made. He maintained his innocence in subsequent media interviews. In May 2008, Simpson's associate Mike Gilbert claimed that Simpson had admitted his role as the murderer, saying he used the knife that Brown was holding when she opened her condo's door for him that night, and that he had stopped taking his arthritis medicine so his hands would swell in court. During the trial, Johnnie Cochran informed Judge Ito that Shawn Chapman contacted the Los Angeles County Jail doctor, who confirmed Simpson was taking his arthritis medication every day, and that the jail's medical records verified this.

In his 2008 book How I Helped O.J. Get Away with Murder, and a 2025 docuseries, Simpson's former sports agent Mike Gilbert revealed that he once asked Simpson what really happened with Nicole, telling Simpson that he had always suspected Simpson was guilty. Simpson allegedly responded: "If Nicole wouldn't have opened the door with a knife, she would still be alive." Simpson's then-lawyer Yale L. Galanter said none of Gilbert's claims were true, and that Gilbert is "a delusional drug addict who needs money." Galanter refused to allow Simpson to comment directly to Gilbert because of Simpson's concurrent robbery trial.

=== 1996–1997 wrongful death civil trial ===
Rufo vs. Simpson
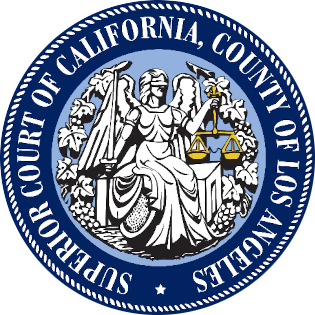
- Seal of the Court
- Court: Superior Court of California, County of Los Angeles
- Decided: February 5, 1997
- Verdict: Simpson liable for the wrongful death of and battery against Goldman, and battery against Brown
- Citation: SCO31947

Court membership
- Judge sitting: Hiroshi Fujisaki

Following Simpson's acquittal of criminal charges, Goldman and Brown's families filed a civil lawsuit against Simpson. Daniel Petrocelli represented plaintiff Fred Goldman (Ronald Goldman's father), while Robert Baker represented Simpson. Superior Court Judge Hiroshi Fujisaki presided, and he barred television and still cameras, radio equipment, and courtroom sketch artists from the courtroom. The trial excluded discussion of racial issues, which were considered "inflammatory and speculative."

On October 23, 1996, opening statements were made, and on January 16, 1997, both sides rested their cases. On February 5, 1997, a civil jury in Santa Monica, California, unanimously found Simpson liable for the wrongful death of and battery against Goldman, and battery against Brown (the Brown family had filed a survivorship claim but not a wrongful death claim). Simpson was ordered to pay $33,500,000 in damages: $8.5 million in compensatory damages to the Goldman family, and $12.5 million in punitive damages to each family. His net worth at the time was $11 million.

In 1997, Simpson defaulted on his mortgage at the home in which he had lived for 20 years, at 360 North Rockingham Avenue, and the lender foreclosed the property. In July 1998, the house was demolished by its next owner, Kenneth Abdalla, an investment banker and president of the Jerry's Famous Deli chain. In February 1999, an auction of Simpson's Heisman Trophy and other belongings netted almost $500,000, which went to the Goldman family. The Goldman family also tried to collect Simpson's NFL $28,000 yearly pension, but failed to collect any money.

In July 2017, after Simpson was granted parole, Ron Goldman's father Fred inquired about the real estate purchases made by Sydney and Justin Simpson, Brown's children with Simpson. David Cook, a lawyer for Fred Goldman, said he would seek bank records and depositions to follow the Simpson children's money trail and see if any of the homes were bought with their father's cash, which could make them eligible for a clawback. "The kids' loss is no greater than Fred's, but Fred's loss should be no greater than theirs," Cook said. In June 2022, Fred alleged in court papers (intended to keep the wrongful death and battery judgment viable) that Simpson owed $96 million due to significant interest generated on the initial order to pay damages.

On November 17, 2025, it was reported that the Simpson Estate agreed to pay nearly $58 million to Goldman's father to settle the civil claim, but it rejected the $117 million claim that was originally sought.

=== Other legal issues ===
In the late 1990s, Simpson attempted to register "O. J. Simpson", "O. J.", and "The Juice" as trademarks for "a broad range of goods, including figurines, trading cards, sportswear, medallions, coins, and prepaid telephone cards." A "concerned citizen", William B. Ritchie, sued to oppose the granting of federal registration on the grounds that doing so would be immoral and scandalous.

In February 2001, Simpson was arrested in Miami-Dade County for simple battery and burglary of an occupied conveyance, for pulling the glasses off another motorist during a traffic dispute three months earlier. If convicted, Simpson could have faced up to 16 years in prison, but he was tried and quickly acquitted of both charges in October.

On December 4, 2001, Simpson's Florida home was searched by the FBI on suspicion that he possessed MDMA or was engaged in money laundering; they had received a tip that he was part of a major drug trafficking ring the agency was investigating. The investigation had thus far led to the arrests of ten suspects. The home was thoroughly searched for two hours, and no illegal drugs were found. Afterwards, Simpson was neither arrested nor charged in relation to the trafficking investigation. However, the FBI did find equipment that allowed for the pirating of satellite radio signals broadcast by satellite television network DirecTV—hypothetically giving a TV set owned by Simpson free access to the radio frequencies of cable TV channels only legally offered by DirecTV through a paid subscription. In March 2004, DirecTV accused Simpson in a Miami federal court of using illegal electronic devices to pirate its broadcast signals. During the ensuing legal case, it presented the court with the evidence that the FBI had gathered in the search. In July 2005, the company won a $25,000 judgment, and Simpson was ordered to pay an additional $33,678 in attorney's fees and costs.

In July 2002, Simpson was arrested in Miami-Dade County for water speeding through a manatee protection zone and failing to comply with proper boating regulations. The misdemeanor boating regulation charge was dropped, and Simpson was fined for the speeding infraction.

In 2007, the state of California said that Simpson owed $1.44 million in back taxes. A tax lien was filed in his case in September 1999.

=== If I Did It book (2006) ===
In 2006, publisher ReganBooks had planned to release Simpson's book If I Did It, which was supposed to be his account of how he would hypothetically kill Brown and Goldman. Arnelle Simpson testified in a deposition that she and Van Exel, president of Raffles Entertainment and Music Production, came up with the idea for the book and pitched it to her father in an attempt to make money. She testified that her father thought about it and eventually agreed to the book deal. Simpson stated:

I have nothing to confess. This was an opportunity for my kids to get their financial legacy. My kids understand. I made it clear that it's blood money, but it's no different than any of the other writers who did books on this case.

In Simpson's hypothetical scenario, he has an unwilling accomplice named "Charlie" who urges him to not engage with Nicole, whom Simpson plans to "scare the shit out of." Simpson ignores Charlie's advice and continues to Nicole's condo, where he finds and confronts Ron Goldman. According to the book, Nicole falls and hits her head on the concrete, and Goldman crouches in a karate pose. As the confrontation escalates, Simpson writes, "Then something went horribly wrong, and I know what happened, but I can't tell you how." He writes that he regained consciousness later with no memory of the actual act of murder:

"Nicole. Jesus. I looked down and saw her on the ground in front of me, curled up in a fetal position at the base of the stairs, not moving. Goldman was only a few feet away, slumped against the bars of the fence. He wasn't moving either. Both he and Nicole were lying in giant pools of blood. I had never seen so much blood in my life. It didn't seem real, and none of it computed." (p. 81)

Pablo Fenjves, a screenwriter and prosecution witness at Simpson's 1995 trial, ghostwrote the book based on interviews with Simpson. The publishing deal allegedly started when ReganBooks employee Judith Regan received a phone call from Simpson's lawyers, who said he was ready to confess to the murders. Regan claimed the word "If" was put in the title so that Simpson would have plausible deniability when his children read the book, because "he couldn't tell them that he had done it." The book was scheduled for release in November 2006, but was cancelled beforehand due to public outcry. A scheduled TV interview with Fox was also cancelled.

In September 2006, Goldman's father took Simpson back to court to obtain control over Simpson's "right to publicity", for purposes of satisfying the judgment in the civil court case. He claimed that Simpson was advanced $1 million for the book deal and interview, and that they were made to "cheat the family" of the damages owed. In January 2007, a federal judge issued a restraining order prohibiting Simpson from spending any advance he may have received on the book deal and interview. The matter was dismissed before trial for lack of jurisdiction. A California state judge also issued an additional restraining order, ordering Simpson to restrict his spending to "ordinary and necessary living expenses." In March, a judge prevented Simpson from receiving any further compensation from the book deal and TV interview, ordering the bundled book rights to be auctioned. In August, a Florida bankruptcy court awarded the book rights to the Goldman family, to partially satisfy the unpaid civil judgment. The family published the first edition of the book later that year, and they renamed it to If I Did It: Confessions of the Killer. They also reduced the word "If" in size to such an extent that it appears within the large red "I" in the title, making the title appear to read I Did It: Confessions of the Killer. Additional material was added by the Goldmans, Fenjves, and investigative journalist Dominick Dunne.

=== 2007 Las Vegas robbery ===
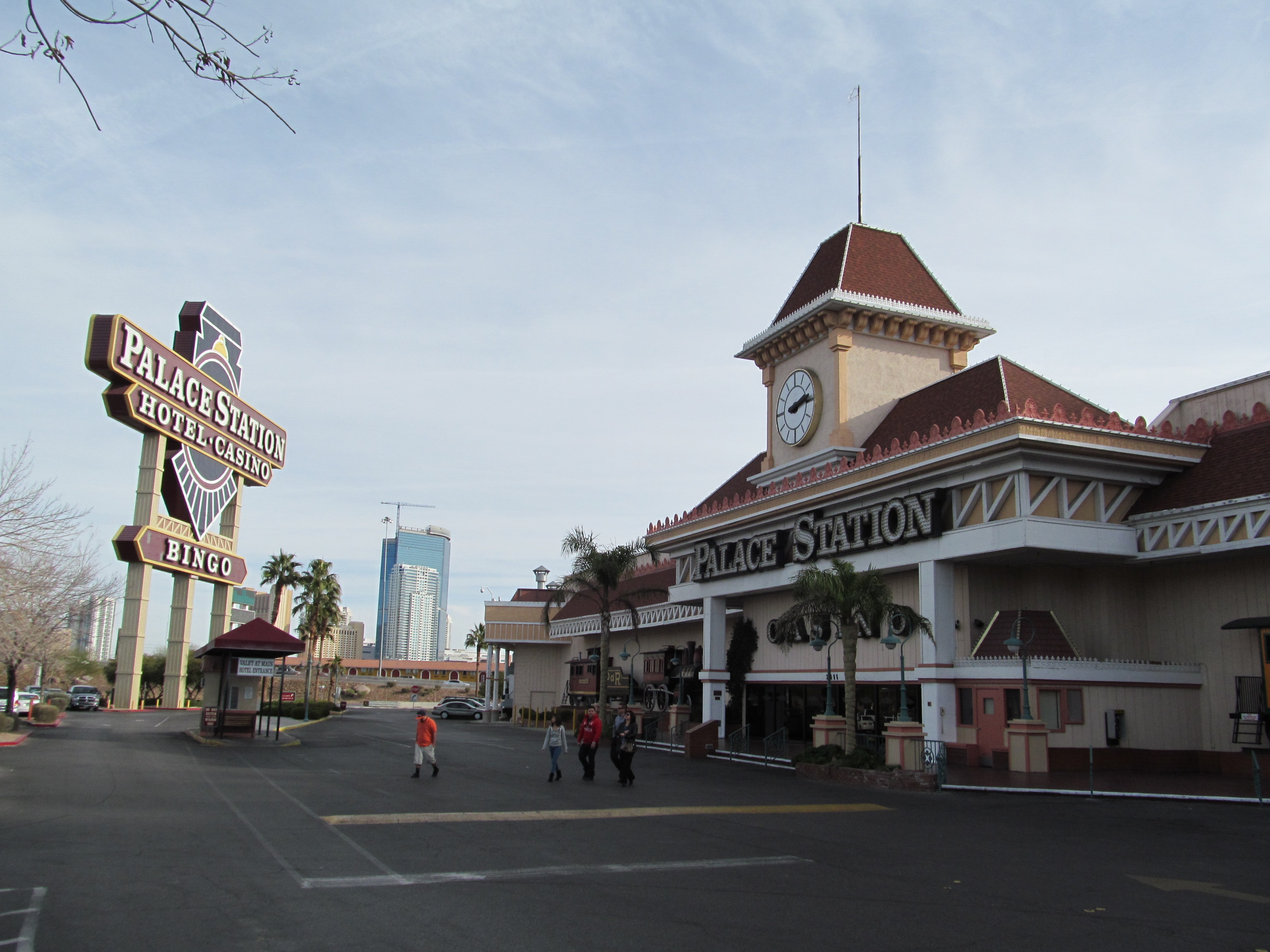
Palace Station in Las Vegas, where the robbery took place

On the night of September 13, 2007, a group of men led by Simpson entered a room at the Palace Station hotel-casino in Las Vegas, and took sports memorabilia at gunpoint, which resulted in Simpson being questioned by police. Simpson admitted to taking the items, which he said had been stolen from him, but denied breaking into the hotel room; he also denied that he or anyone else carried a gun. He was initially released after questioning.

Two days later, Simpson was arrested, and he was initially held without bail. Along with three other men, Simpson was charged with multiple felony counts, including criminal conspiracy, kidnapping, assault, robbery, and aggravated assault. Bail was set at $125,000, with stipulations that Simpson have no contact with the co-defendants and that he surrender his passport. Simpson did not enter a plea. By the end of October 2007, all three of Simpson's co-defendants had plea-bargained with the prosecution in the Clark County, Nevada, court case. Walter Alexander and Charles H. Cashmore accepted plea agreements in exchange for reduced charges and their testimony against Simpson and three other co-defendants, including testimony that guns were used in the robbery. Co-defendant Michael McClinton told a Las Vegas judge that he too would plead guilty to reduced charges and testify against Simpson that guns were used in the robbery. After the hearings, the judge ordered that Simpson be tried for the robbery.

On November 8, 2007, Simpson had a preliminary hearing to decide whether he would be tried for the charges. He was held over for trial on all 12 counts. Simpson pleaded not guilty on November 29, with an initial setting for trial in April 2008, although it was soon set for September to give the defense more time for their case. In January 2008, Simpson was taken into custody in Florida and was extradited to Las Vegas, where he was incarcerated at the Clark County jail for violating the terms of his bail by attempting to contact co-defendant Clarence "C. J." Stewart. District Attorney David Roger of Clark County provided District Court Judge Jackie Glass with evidence that Simpson had violated his bail terms. A hearing took place on January 16. Glass raised Simpson's bail to US$250,000 and ordered that he remain in county jail until 15 percent was paid in cash. Simpson posted bond that evening and returned to Miami the next day.

The trial began on September 8, 2008, in the court of Nevada District Court Judge Jackie Glass, before an all-white jury, in stark contrast to Simpson's earlier murder trial. Simpson and his co-defendant were found guilty of all charges on October 3. On October 10, Simpson's counsel moved for a new trial (trial de novo) on grounds of judicial errors and insufficient evidence. Simpson's attorney announced he would appeal to the Nevada Supreme Court if Judge Glass denied the motion. The attorney for Simpson's co-defendant, C. J. Stewart, petitioned for a new trial, alleging Stewart should have been tried separately and cited possible misconduct by the jury foreman.

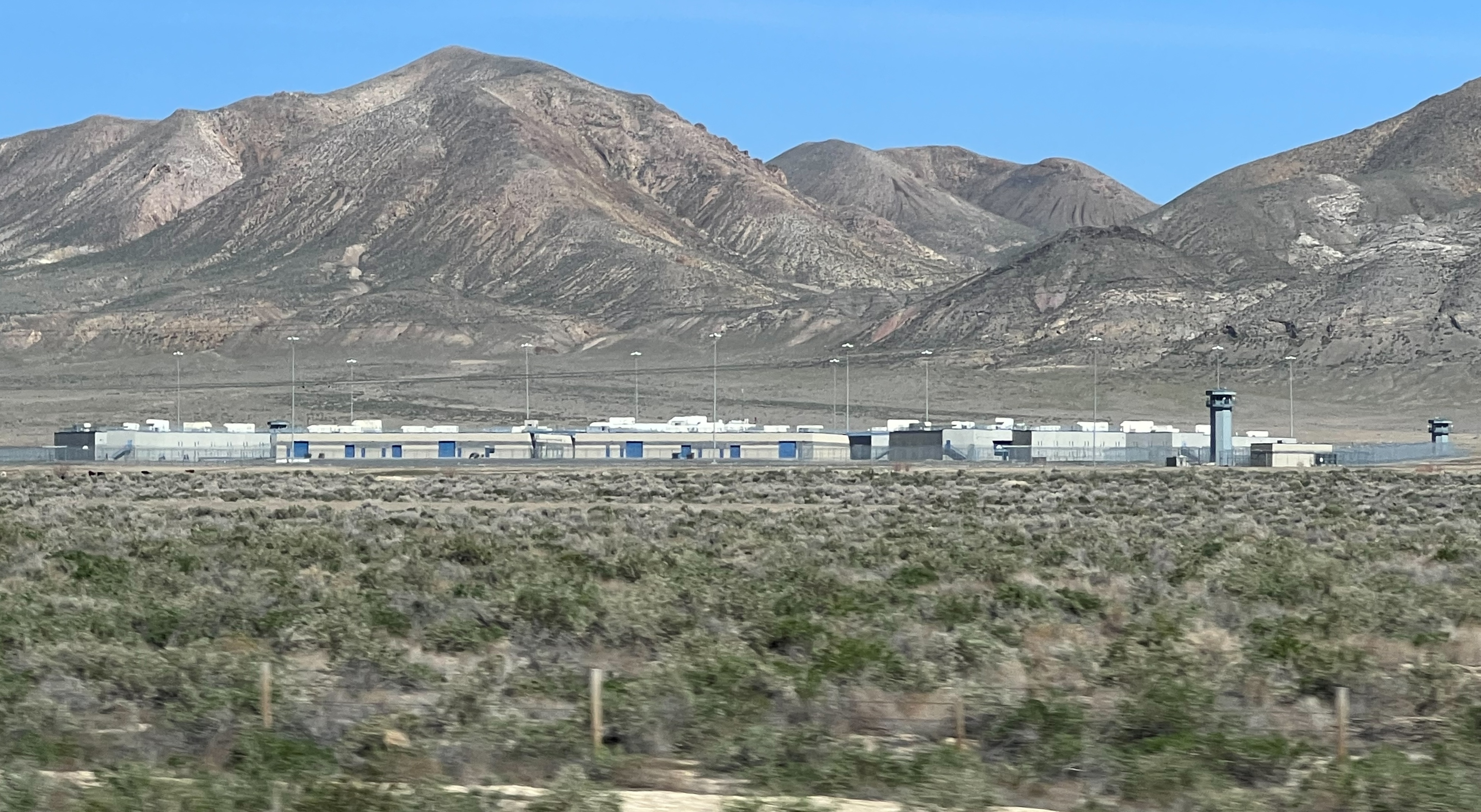
Lovelock Correctional Center in Pershing County, Nevada, in 2023

Simpson faced a possible life sentence with parole on the kidnapping charge, and mandatory prison time for armed robbery. On December 5, 2008, Simpson was sentenced to a total of 33 years in prison, with the possibility of parole after nine years, in 2017. In September 2009, the Nevada Supreme Court denied a request for bail during Simpson's appeal. In October 2010, the Nevada Supreme Court affirmed his convictions. He served his sentence at the Lovelock Correctional Center as inmate 1027820. He worked as a gym janitor there.

A Nevada judge agreed in October 2012 to "reopen the armed robbery and kidnapping case against O. J. Simpson to determine if the former football star was so badly represented by his lawyers that he should be freed from prison and get another trial." A hearing was held beginning May 2013 to determine if Simpson was entitled to a new trial. In November, Judge Linda Bell denied Simpson's bid for a new trial on the robbery conviction. In her ruling, Bell wrote that all Simpson's contentions lacked merit.

==== 2017 paroled release from prison ====
On July 31, 2013, the Nevada parole board granted Simpson parole on some convictions, but his imprisonment continued based on the weapons and assault convictions. The board considered Simpson's prior record of criminal convictions and good behavior in prison in coming to the decision. At his parole hearing on July 20, 2017, the board decided to grant Simpson parole, with certain parole conditions such as travel restrictions, non-contact with co-defendants from the robbery, and not drinking excessively. He was released on October 1, having served almost nine years. In December 2021, Simpson was granted an early discharge from parole by the Nevada Division of Parole and Probation, for good behavior.

== Personal life ==
In 1995, after his acquittal for murder, Simpson began a relationship with Christie Prody that lasted for 13 years. At the time their relationship started, Prody was 19 years old and working as a cocktail waitress. After their relationship ended, Prody stated that she often feared for her life during the relationship.

To avoid paying the judgment he received in his 1997 civil trial, Simpson sought refuge in Florida, one of the few states where pensions and residences cannot generally be seized to collect debts. In 2000, he purchased a home in Miami-Dade County, 20 miles (32 km) south of Miami. He "struggled to remake his life, raise his children, and stay out of trouble", and lived off pensions from the NFL, Screen Actors Guild, and other sources. He sent two of his children to prep school and college. After his release from prison in 2017, Simpson joined Twitter, and gained a following of 800,000 followers by the time of his death.

After Simpson retired from football, he began playing golf, which was a "constant" in his life before and after the acquittal. He often played in both the Los Angeles area and (after he moved to Florida) the Miami area. He played with professional golfers like Arnold Palmer, until they stopped associating with him around the time of his murder trial. Afterwards, however, he still played with notable people like Michael Jordan. Simpson's membership at the Riviera Country Club in Los Angeles was suspended, so he started playing at Rancho Park when in that city. Sports Illustrated reported in 1997 that other golfers did not want him in their presence.

=== Claims of Simpson having CTE ===
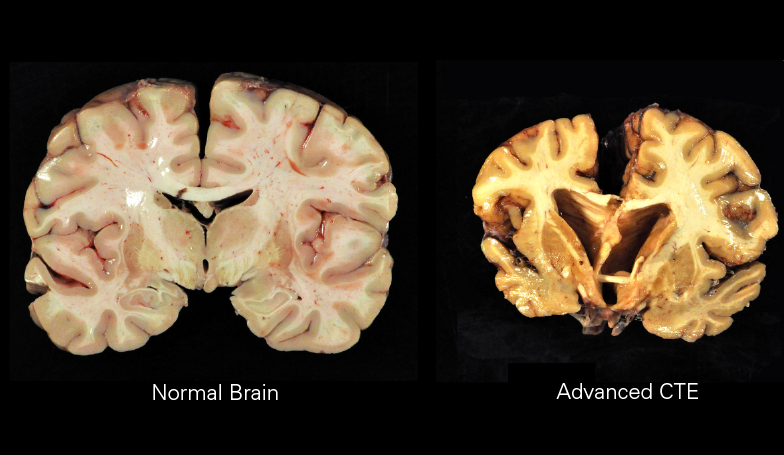
A normal human brain (left) and one with advanced CTE (right)

Bennet Omalu, the doctor who discovered chronic traumatic encephalopathy (CTE), a disease that causes progressive neurodegeneration in the human brain, said in 2016 that he would "bet [his] medical license" that Simpson had the disease. CTE, which can be diagnosed only postmortem, is caused by repeated incidents of blunt trauma, such as concussions, that result in head injuries. Thus, it is occasionally found in players of American football, whose heads frequently collide during maneuvers such as tackles. Patients with advanced CTE are more likely to engage in impulsive, violent behavior than others. Omalu noted that Simpson had received thousands of blunt force impacts to his head during his career, and Omalu said this was the reason he thought Simpson had CTE—not Simpson's alleged violent impulses behind murdering Brown and Goldman, which Omalu said could not be caused by CTE alone. As of 2025, research suggests that there may be a link between the CTE afflictions of homicidally violent football players (such as Aaron Hernandez, Philip Adams, and Shane Tamura) and their violent behavior.

Following Simpson's convictions for robbery in 2008, his lawyer told the convicting court that Simpson had suffered concussions that made brain damage responsible for Simpson's actions, rather than Simpson himself—theoretically proving that the convictions were unjust. In 2018, Simpson said he suspected he had CTE, saying:

I do recognize that it probably affects you in short-term memory more than long-term. I know with me, I have days I can't find words. I literally cannot find words or the name of somebody I know. That gets a little scary.

After Simpson's death, his family gave a "hard no" response to scientists who had requested to study his brain.

=== Illness and death ===
In May 2023, Simpson reported that he had been diagnosed with cancer and expressed confidence that he would beat it. He also said he had started chemotherapy. In February 2024, it was reported that Simpson was undergoing treatment for prostate cancer. A week and a half before his death, Simpson cancelled a scheduled memorabilia signing because he was not feeling well. In his last Twitter video on February 11, he said that while he was "dealing with some issues", he was in good health. In the final days before his death, all of Simpson's children visited him. He died of the disease on April 10, 2024, at the age of 76. At the time, Simpson had been living in Las Vegas, next to the Rhodes Ranch Golf Club. Simpson shared a home with his oldest daughter Arnelle while his youngest son Justin lived up the street from him.

Simpson was cremated at the Palm Mortuary in Downtown Las Vegas on April 17, 2024. The executor of Simpson's estate announced plans to fight the estate's money going to the Brown and Goldman families, but reversed course soon after. No plans were made for a public memorial, while there were tentative discussions of a celebration of life ceremony for the family. Malcolm LeVergne, the attorney handling Simpson's estate, stated that his cremains would be given to his children.

==== Reactions from football organizations ====
Simpson's death was met with mixed reactions, as his legal history overshadowed his sporting achievements. The Bills, 49ers, and USC did not publish any condolences or tributes following his death. The NFL did not release a statement, but a video that announced Simpson's death and featured highlights from his football career was uploaded on the NFL's website and YouTube channel. The Pro Football Hall of Fame published a news release, and lowered its flag to half-mast. The Heisman Trophy organization tweeted a tribute to Simpson, and offered condolences to his family.

==== Reactions from the Brown and Goldman families ====
The Goldman family issued a statement, which read in part:

The news of Ron's killer passing away is a mixed bag of complicated emotions and reminds us that the journey through grief is not linear. For three decades we tirelessly pursued justice for Ron and Nicole, and despite a civil judgement and his confession in If I Did It, the hope for true accountability has ended... And despite his death, the mission continues; there's always more to be done.

Brown's sisters said in a statement:

[Nicole's] life was stolen from her and while her abuser is finally gone, it doesn't take away the anguish we feel or the pain of her children who lost their mother.

==== Reactions from former colleagues ====
Booker Edgerson, Simpson's teammate from the Buffalo Bills, said he was planning to visit Simpson before his death, and said: "We really didn't get along in the beginning. But eventually we became roommates and everything. So we had an outstanding relationship ... We went through a lot when he had his good years in Buffalo ... We had good times, and we understood each other." Joe DeLamielleure, another teammate of Simpson's from the Bills, said he spoke with Simpson on the phone a month prior, and added:

...[He] was an icon in the nation. And he meant a lot to people doing those commercials. He did a lot for the Black race even though he didn't know it. He wasn't Muhammad Ali or anything, but he was doing things for athletes and not just Black athletes, but he kicked us into a really big thing. That's what I think of him. He was a groundbreaker ... As for O.J. and what he did or didn't do, it's not my place to judge anybody.

Basketball player Magic Johnson tweeted his and his wife's prayers for Simpson's family during his difficult passing. Bob Costas, once Simpson's fellow sportscaster at NBC Sports, said: "I can't think of anyone historical or someone that we may have known where the first chapter and the second chapter of their lives are such a stark contrast". Caitlyn Jenner, a former acquaintance of Simpson's and member of the Kardashian family, tweeted: "Good Riddance". Rappers Cam'ron and Mase paid tribute to Simpson on the sports talk show It is What It is, where Simpson joined as a football analyst in the last months of his life. The two criticized Jenner's statement. David Zucker, director of the Naked Gun movies, posted on Instagram: "His acting was a lot like his murdering: He got away with it, but no one believed him."

==== Other responses ====
Sports analyst Stephen A. Smith said: "One of the greatest athletes we have ever seen ... But it all pales in comparison to him being perceived as a double murderer." Former football player Torrey Smith tweeted that while he's "not a big OJ guy," he felt that "using OJ's court pictures to announce his death is disgusting! Regardless of what you may think about him he was innocent in court and has kids out here. Y'all have no respect." White House Press Secretary Karine Jean-Pierre said: "Our thoughts are with his families during this difficult time ... I know that they have asked for some privacy and so we're going to respect that."

Former football player Todd Gurley praised Simpson for being like family to him and listed his football accomplishments in a tweet. Singer Stephanie Mills posted tributes to Simpson on social media, focusing on his NFL career and Hertz commercials. Actress Glenn Close said she personally believed in Simpson's guilt, but hoped his children were alright and vividly recalled watching the White Bronco chase while she was onstage performing in Sunset Boulevard. Actor Courtney B. Vance, who portrayed Johnnie Cochran in The People v. O. J. Simpson: American Crime Story, later said of Simpson's death:

He went to the grave with all that he knew, and maybe that's a good thing ... everybody had an opinion about what happened, and it becomes larger than the actual event. People had to stake their careers on what they thought ... He'd gotten out of going to jail thanks to Marcia Clark, Chris Darden, and Johnnie Cochran. Johnnie was a brilliant lawyer, but I think they [Clark and Darden] were just inept. It's on them to prove what happened. And they didn't prove it beyond a reasonable doubt.

Simpson was featured in the in memoriam segment at the 24th BET Awards, surprising people in attendance. The Academy of Television Arts & Sciences left Simpson out of the in memoriam segment at the 76th Primetime Emmy Awards, but included him in a written version of the segment on the Academy's website. Simpson was also featured in the in memoriam segment of the 56th NAACP Image Awards.

=== Money owed ===
Simpson's longtime Las Vegas attorney Malcolm LaVergne was named as Simpson's "personal representative" and executor of the will and testament, according to court records. Justin Simpson, Simpson's son, was named as "successor personal representative". In August 2024, LaVergne revealed that Simpson owed him $269,000 at the time of his death and that he was seeking to claim possession of Simpson's "forever home" in Las Vegas from Simpson's son Justin as part of a way to pay off the debt. Speaking to TMZ, LaVergne confirmed that due to Simpson's outstanding debts, such as those related to the 1997 civil ruling, the expensive funeral and $500,000 Simpson owed to the state of California, he was making an effort to liquidate Simpson's assets, and that Simpson's family was putting up resistance to his efforts. Simpson's creditors include not just the Goldman family, but also the IRS and the California Tax Board. Simpson's decision to change his primary residence from Florida to Nevada also made him more vulnerable to the Goldman family being able to collect money from what he earned through his NFL pension, with Ron Goldman's father Fred seeking $117 million as of July 2024. Simpson's ashes would be made into jewelry (memorial diamonds), with only his four children taking possession. LaVergne confirmed that he did not take possession of any of the cremation jewelry, telling TMZ that he had no interest in possessing Simpson's ashes. According to LaVergne, $4,243.06 was spent to go through with Simpson's cremation, create the jewelry, and draw up the death certificates.

=== Buffalo Bills Wall of Fame ===
In June 2026, it was announced the Buffalo Bills' new stadium would not include any recognition of Simpson, who was the first member of the organization's Wall of Fame in 1980. "We have made an organizational decision that he is not a fit to display inside our new stadium and family circle," said Pete Guelli, chief operating officer for the Bills, in a statement.

Politician and community activist Betty Jean Grant, along with football fans of Simpson, protested his exclusion from the new Bills Wall of Fame. Grant stated: "I think O.J.'s accomplishments are the reason why we still have the Buffalo Bills in Western New York, and you can't erase or downsize it and cannot say that what he did on the field was not spectacular. What harm would it be to those visiting the stadium to have his name and accomplishments there?" "The jury has spoken, and if the Bills had a problem with that verdict or they had a problem with what happened with O.J. Simpson, it should have been discussed then, not 32 years later. When the jury acquitted him, the issue was not raised to take his name off, as they should not have for 32 years, his name has remained on the wall of fame, why now?"

Journalist and scholar Meredith Clark reflected on the Bills' decision to not include Simpson on their new Wall of Fame: "This was a marketing decision by the Bills that considers what the risk would be to their reputation and brand if they were to do something that honors O.J. Simpson. And given where we are culturally, honoring any Black person who isn't completely above reproach is inviting critique directly from the White House. And I can see why they would make this decision." Clark further stated:

We (Black people) don't have space in American society to be considered in spite of our significant flaws. O.J. was acquitted. Legally, he's not held responsible for the deaths of Nicole Brown Simpson and Ronald Goldman. But, socially and culturally, he still has to carry that baggage. And that baggage is not just what happened in their deaths; it is what has happened in the deaths of every white woman, in particular, who has ever been harmed by a Black man. And the fear of Black men harming white women.

== In popular culture ==
=== Overview ===
The New York Times wrote that Simpson "generated a tide of tell-all books, movies, studies and debate over questions of justice, race relations and celebrity in a nation that adores its heroes." More than 30 books had been written on Simpson by the time of his death.

=== Film and television ===
During and after the murder trial, Simpson was the frequent subject of mocking jokes by Norm Macdonald on Saturday Night Live. These jokes, which became famous, are widely believed to have caused Macdonald to be fired by NBC executive Don Ohlmeyer, who was friends with Simpson. Television host Conan O'Brien remembered Macdonald's comedy as the most notable commentary about Simpson's trials. In the wake of Simpson's death, Macdonald's jokes about him went viral. Prior to Macdonald's death, he jokingly claimed to have changed his mind about Simpson's guilt. According to Macdonald's friend Lori Jo Hoekstra, however, that new commentary was enough for Simpson to reach out to Macdonald and offer to play golf.

In Fox Network's TV movie, The O. J. Simpson Story (1995), Simpson is portrayed as a youth by Bumper Robinson and as an adult by Bobby Hosea; his close friend Al Cowlings is portrayed as a youth by Terrence Howard and as an adult by David Roberson. In CBS's TV movie American Tragedy (2000), Simpson is played by Raymond Forchion.

BBC TV's documentary, O.J. Simpson: The Untold Story (2000), produced by Malcolm Brinkworth, "reveals that clues that some believe pointed away from Simpson as the killer were dismissed or ignored and highlights two other leads that could shed new light on the case." The Investigation Discovery TV documentary film OJ: Trial of the Century (2014) begins on the day of the murders, ends on the reading of the verdict, and comprises actual media footage of events and reactions, as they unfolded. Also an Investigation Discovery TV documentary is O.J. Simpson Trial: The Real Story (2016), which entirely comprises archival news footage of the murder case, the Bronco chase, the trial, the verdict, and reactions.

The documentary miniseries, O.J.: Made in America (2016), directed by Ezra Edelman and produced by Laylow Films, is an American five-part, 7 1/2-hour film that previewed at the Tribeca and Sundance Film Festivals, and aired as part of the 30 for 30 series airing on the ABC and ESPN sister networks. This film adds "rich contextual layers to the case, including a dive into the history of Los Angeles race relations that played such a central role in his acquittal." Mary McNamara wrote she was impressed the film had "that ability to show all sides of this history, to balance opposing forces and push them forward." James Poniewozik observed in his New York Times review that "the director Ezra Edelman pulls back, way back, like a news chopper over a freeway chase. Before you hear about the trial, the documentary says, you need to hear all the stories – the stories of race, celebrity, sports, America – that it's a part of." The film won the 2017 Academy Award for Best Documentary Feature.

In FX's cable TV miniseries The People v. O. J. Simpson: American Crime Story (2016), based on Jeffrey Toobin's book The Run of His Life: The People v. O.J. Simpson (1997), Simpson is portrayed by Cuba Gooding Jr. It focuses on the events of the trial, and specifically Simpson's associates during it.

Fox's TV special O.J. Simpson: The Lost Confession? (2018) features an interview Simpson gave in 2006 with publisher Judith Regan, where he gave "hypothetical" details about his role in the murders. Though Simpson stated that the details he described were hypothetical, the interview was considered to be an implied confession to the murders. In 2018, it was announced Boris Kodjoe would portray Simpson in a film titled Nicole & O.J. The movie, whose title has been changed to The Juice, was scheduled for release in 2025. In 2020, Court TV premiered OJ25, a 25-part series documenting each week of the trial and hosted by former Los Angeles prosecutor and legal analyst Roger Cossack.

=== Exhibits ===
The Bronco from Simpson's police chase is on display in Pigeon Forge, Tennessee's Alcatraz East Crime Museum.

In 2017, Adam Papagan curated a pop-up museum featuring artifacts and ephemera from the trial at Coagula Curatorial gallery in Los Angeles.

== Filmography ==
Film and television credits
| Year | Film | Role | Notes |
|---|---|---|---|
| 1968 | Ironside | Onlooker—uncredited | |
| 1968 | Dragnet 1968 | Student—uncredited | |
| 1969 | Medical Center | Bru Wiley | TV episode "The Last 10 Yards" |
| 1969 | The Dream of Hamish Mose | Unknown | Unreleased film |
| 1971 | Why? | The Athlete | Short film |
| 1974 | The Klansman | Harry Jernigan | |
| 1974 | The Towering Inferno | Garth | |
| 1976 | The Cassandra Crossing | Haley | |
| 1976 | Killer Force | Alexander | |
| 1977 | A Killing Affair | Woodrow York | TV |
| 1977 | Roots | Kadi Touray | |
| 1978 | Capricorn One | Cmdr. John Walker | |
| 1978 | Saturday Night Live | Host | TV (February 25, 1978) |
| 1979 | Firepower | Catlett | |
| 1979 | Goldie and the Boxer | Joe Gallagher | TV (executive producer) |
| 1980 | Detour to Terror | Lee Hayes | TV (executive producer) |
| 1981 | Goldie and the Boxer Go to Hollywood | Joe Gallagher | TV (executive producer) |
| 1983 | Cocaine and Blue Eyes | Michael Brennen | TV (executive producer) |
| 1983 | Hambone and Hillie | Tucker | |
| 1985–91 | 1st & Ten | T.D. Parker | 67 episodes |
| 1987 | Back to the Beach | Man at Airport | Uncredited |
| 1987 | Student Exchange | Soccer Coach | TV |
| 1988 | The Naked Gun: From the Files of Police Squad! | Detective Nordberg | |
| 1989 | In the Heat of the Night | Councilman Lawson Stiles | TV episode "Walkout" |
| 1991 | The Naked Gun 2 1/2: The Smell of Fear | Detective Nordberg | |
| 1993 | Adventures in Wonderland | Himself | TV episode "White Rabbits Can't Jump", unaired |
| 1993 | CIA Code Name: Alexa | Nick Murphy | |
| 1993 | For Goodness Sake | Man in restaurant | Simpson was edited out of later releases |
| 1993 | No Place to Hide | Allie Wheeler | |
| 1994 | Naked Gun 33 1/3: The Final Insult | Detective Nordberg | |
| 1994 | Frogmen | John 'Bullfrog' Burke | Unaired TV movie |
| 2006 | Juiced with O. J. Simpson | Himself | TV pay-per-view |
| 2011 | Jail | Himself | TV, season 2, episode 18 |
| 2018 | Who Is America? | Himself | TV, episode 7 |

== See also ==
- List of NCAA major college football yearly rushing leaders
- Murder of Alison Shaughnessy – UK case in which the media was accused of "O.J. Simpson-style reporting"
- List of NFL players with chronic traumatic encephalopathy § Deceased players suspected of having had CTE
