= Murder of Nicole Brown Simpson and Ron Goldman =

1994 double murder in Los Angeles, U.S.

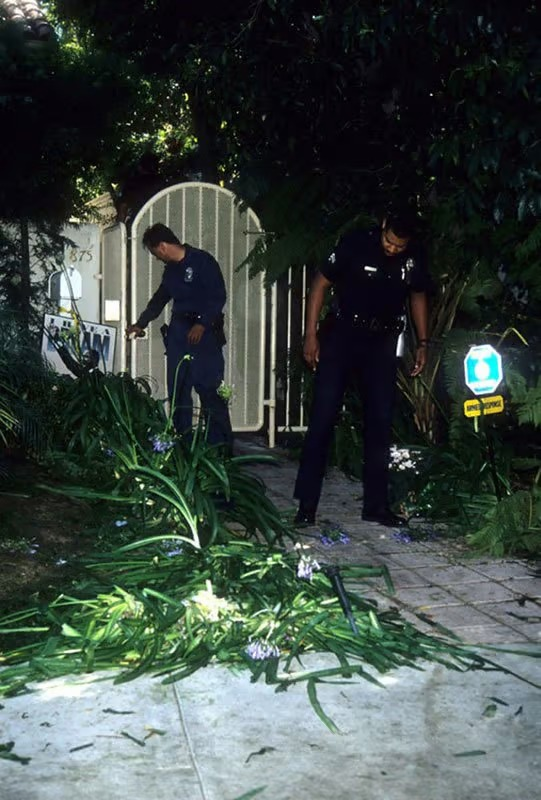
- Police officers examining the crime scene
- Location: Brentwood, Los Angeles, California, U.S.
- Date: June 12, 1994; 32 years ago
- Attack type: Murder by stabbing
- Deaths: 2
- Victims: Nicole Brown Simpson; Ron Goldman

On June 12, 1994, Nicole Brown Simpson and her friend Ron Goldman were murdered outside Brown's condominium in Brentwood, Los Angeles, United States. Brown's ex-husband, retired football player and media personality O. J. Simpson, was charged with the murders and became a fugitive from justice after failing to turn himself in to the Los Angeles Police Department (LAPD) on June 17. A low-speed chase was broadcast live on television as Simpson fled in a white Ford Bronco, belonging to and driven by his friend Al Cowlings, before surrendering to authorities at his Brentwood estate.

Brown had met Simpson in 1977 when she was aged 18 and working as a waitress. Simpson and Brown married on February 2, 1985, and had two children together. Their marriage was described as involving domestic violence, with Brown alleging in writing that Simpson had beaten her on multiple occasions. The case garnered immense media coverage and public interest, especially the events surrounding Simpson's attempt to avoid arrest. The subsequent criminal trial in Los Angeles County Superior Court saw Simpson tried and acquitted for the murders. The trial and verdict were divisive. A later civil trial found Simpson liable for the deaths and awarded the Goldman family $33.5 million in damages (equivalent to $67 million in 2025 dollars), though little was paid.

== Background ==
=== Simpson–Brown marriage ===
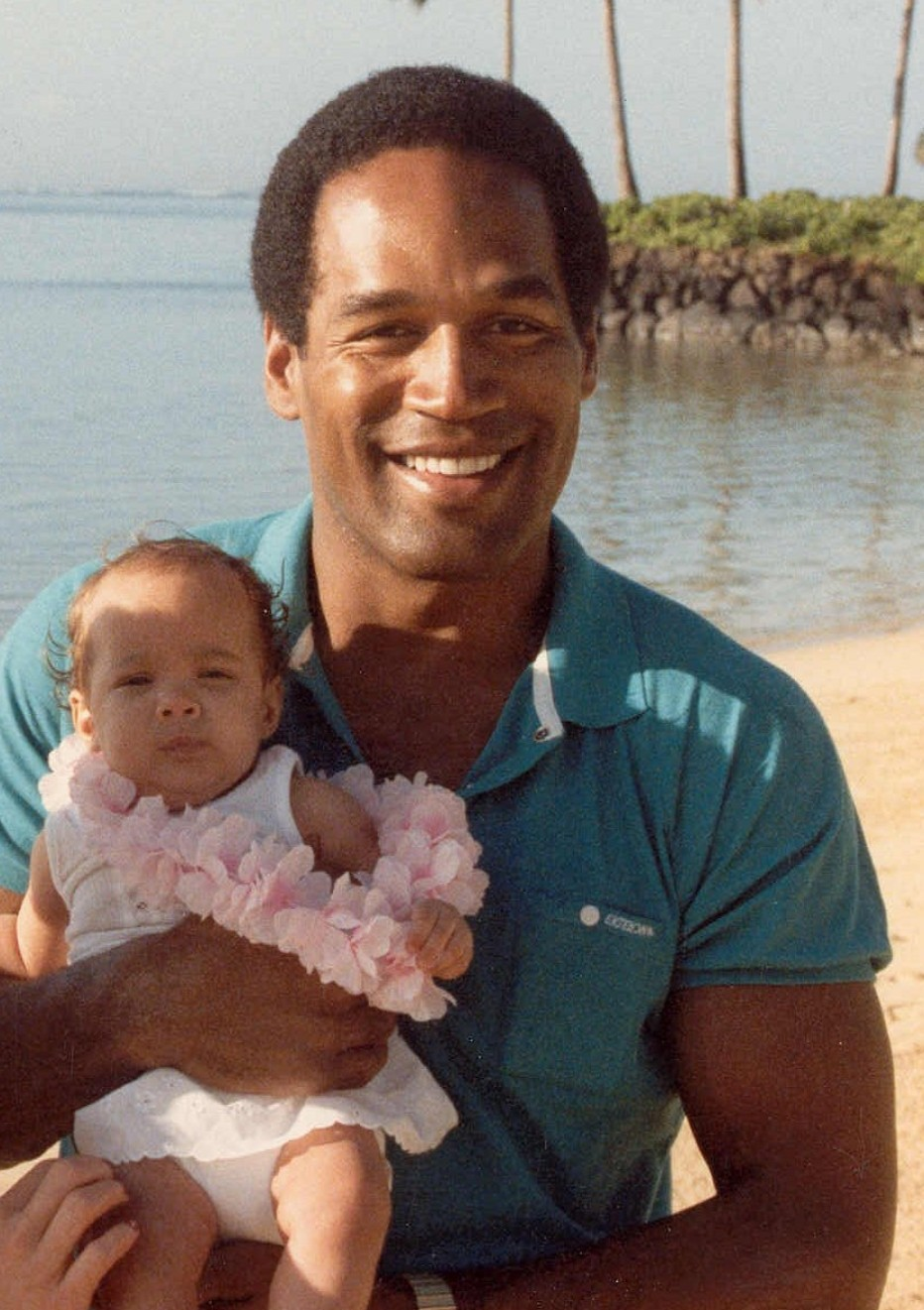
O. J. Simpson with his daughter Sydney, 1986

Brown met Simpson in 1977 when he was 30 and she was 18, working as a waitress at the Daisy (a Beverly Hills private club). They began dating although Simpson was married; he filed for divorce from his first wife in March 1979.

Simpson and Brown married on February 2, 1985. They had two children together, daughter Sydney (b. 1985) and son Justin (b. 1988). Brown signed a prenuptial agreement that prohibited her from working while married.

According to psychologist Lenore E. Walker, the Simpson–Brown marriage was a "textbook example of domestic abuse".

In letters and other documents, Brown wrote that Simpson had beaten her in public, during sex, and even in front of family and friends. She described an incident in which Simpson broke her arm during a fight; to prevent him from being arrested, she told emergency room staff that she had fallen off her bike. Brown wrote that she felt conflicted about notifying police of the abuse because she was financially dependent on Simpson. Of the 62 incidents of abuse, the police were notified eight times, and Simpson was arrested once. On February 25, 1992, Brown filed for divorce, citing "irreconcilable differences".

Brown said that Simpson stalked and harassed her after they divorced – an intimidation tactic meant to force the victim to return to the abuser. She said he had spied on her having sex with her new boyfriend and that she felt her life was in danger because Simpson had threatened to kill her if he ever found her with another man. She drafted a will. On June 8, 1994, a woman named Nicole (presumed to be Brown) telephoned Sojourn House, a women's shelter. She was considering staying at the shelter because she was afraid of what her ex-husband (presumed to be Simpson) might do to her, as she was refusing his pleas to reconcile their marriage.

== Murders ==
Locations
1 21:20-21:40 Simpson and Kaelin visit McDonalds, corner of 26th Street and Santa Monica Boulevard
2 21:50 Goldman leaves Mezzaluna restaurant
3 Brown's home, 875 South Bundy Drive, location of the murders
4 22:40-22:50 Jill Shively sights Simpson driving white Bronco erratically at the intersection of Bundy Drive and San Vicente Boulevard
5 22:51-22:52 Kaelin hears banging noises at Simpson's home, 360 North Rockingham Avenue from where right-hand glove later found
~23:00 Simpson left in limo

On the evening of June 12, 1994, Brown and Simpson both attended their daughter Sydney's dance recital at Paul Revere Middle School. Afterward, Brown and her family went to eat at Mezzaluna restaurant. One of the waiters at the restaurant was Ron Goldman, who had become close friends with Brown in recent weeks, but was not assigned to the Brown family's table.

Brown and her children went to Ben & Jerry's before returning to her condominium at 875 Bundy Drive, Brentwood. The manager of Mezzaluna recounted that Brown's mother telephoned the restaurant at 9:34 pm PDT asking about a pair of lost eyeglasses. The manager found the eyeglasses and put them in a white envelope, which Goldman took with him as he left the restaurant at the end of his shift at 9:30 pm; he intended to drop them off at Brown's place.

Brown's neighbors testified that they heard profuse barking coming from outside throughout the night, beginning around 10:15 pm. Around 10:55 pm., a dogwalker who lived a few blocks away from Brown came across Brown's Akita dog barking in the street outside her home. The Akita, whose legs were covered in blood, followed the man home; he tried to walk the dog back to where he found it, but the dog resisted. Later, he left the Akita with a neighboring couple who offered to keep the dog overnight; as the dog was agitated, the couple decided to walk it back to where it had been found. Around midnight, as they reached the area where the Akita had been found, the dog stopped outside Brown's home and the couple saw Brown's body lying outside the house. Police were called to the scene and found Goldman's body near Brown's.

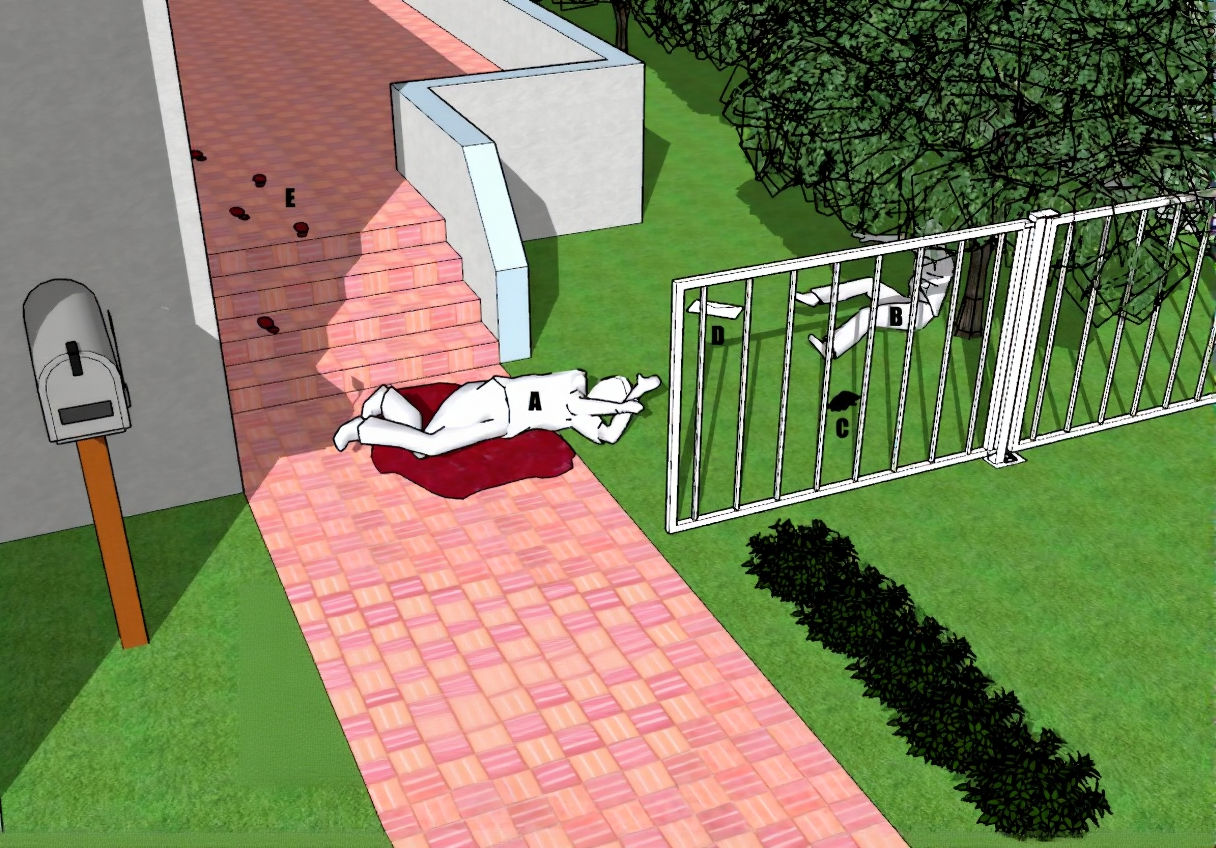
Representation of the crime scene. A marks where Nicole Brown Simpson's body was found. B marks where Ron Goldman's body was found.

The front door to Brown's condominium was open when the bodies were found, but there were no signs that anyone had entered the building, by breaking in or otherwise. Brown's body was lying face down and barefoot at the bottom of the stairs leading to the door. The walkway leading to the stairs was covered in blood, but the soles of Brown's feet were clean; based on this evidence, investigators concluded that she was the first person to be attacked and the intended target. She had been stabbed multiple times in the head and neck, but there were few defensive wounds on her hands, implying a short struggle to investigators. The final wound inflicted ran deep into her neck, severing her carotid artery. A large bruise in the center of her upper back with a corresponding foot print on her clothing indicated to investigators that, after killing Goldman, the assailant returned to Brown who was on the ground, pulled her head back by the hair and slit her throat. Her larynx could be seen through the gaping wound in her neck, and vertebra C3 was incised; Brown's head barely remained attached to her body.

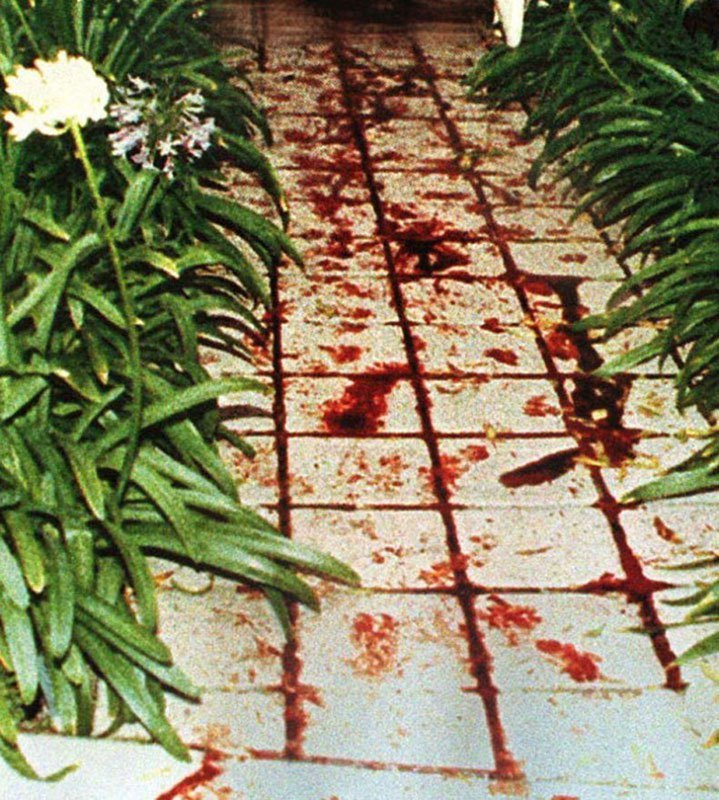
Crime scene photo at Brown's home

Goldman's body lay nearby, close to a tree and the fence. He had been stabbed multiple times in the body and neck, but there were relatively few defensive wounds on his hands, signifying a short struggle to investigators. Forensic evidence from the Los Angeles County coroner alleged that the assailant stabbed Goldman with one hand while holding him in a chokehold. Near Goldman's body were a blue knit cap; a left-hand, extra-large Aris Isotoner light leather glove; and the envelope containing the glasses that he was returning. Detectives concluded that Goldman came to Brown's house during her murder and that the assailant killed him to remove any witnesses. A trail of bloody shoe prints ran through the back gate. To the left of some of the prints were drops of blood from the killer, who was apparently bleeding from the left hand. Measuring the distance between the prints indicated that the assailant walked – rather than ran – away from the scene.

== Arrest of O. J. Simpson ==
=== Whereabouts on June 12 ===
Following the recital, Simpson ate takeout food from McDonald's with Kato Kaelin, a bit-part actor and family friend who had been given the use of a guest house on Simpson's estate. Rumors circulated that Simpson had been on drugs at the time of the murder (later dismissed as blood tests were negative for Simpson, Brown, and Goldman), and the New York Post's Cindy Adams reported that the pair had gone to a local Burger King, where a prominent drug dealer known only as "J. R." later said he had sold them crystal meth.

On the night of June 12, Simpson was scheduled to board a red-eye flight from Los Angeles International Airport to Chicago, where he was due to play golf the following day at a convention with representatives of The Hertz Corporation, for whom he was a spokesman. The flight was due to leave at 11:45 pm. Limousine driver Allan Park arrived early at Simpson's Rockingham estate to pick him up at around 10:25 pm. Park drove around the estate to make sure he could navigate the area with the stretch limousine properly and to see which driveway would have the best access for the car. He began to buzz the intercom at 10:40, but got no response. He noted the house was dark, and nobody appeared to be home as he smoked a cigarette and made several calls to his boss to get Simpson's home phone number. He testified that he saw a "shadowy African-American figure", the same size as Simpson, enter the front door from where the driveway starts, before the lights came on; he did not see what direction the figure came from. He testified that he saw Simpson's house number on the curb outside the estate, but no car was parked outside. The prosecution presented exhibits showing the position next to the house number on the curb in which Simpson's Ford Bronco was found the next morning, implying that Park would surely have noticed the Bronco if it had been there when he arrived to pick up Simpson.

Around the time Park saw the "shadowy figure" arrive at Simpson's home, Kaelin was having a telephone conversation with a friend. At approximately 10:40, something crashed into the wall of the guest house Kaelin was staying in, which he described as three "thumps" and which he feared was an earthquake. Kaelin hung up the phone and ventured outside to investigate the noises, but did not go directly down the dark south pathway from which the thumps had originated. Instead, he walked to the front of the property, where he saw the limousine parked outside. Kaelin let the limousine in, and Simpson finally came out through the front door a few minutes later, claiming he had overslept. Both Park and Kaelin would later testify that Simpson seemed agitated that night.

Park noted that on the way to the airport, Simpson complained about how hot it was, and was sweating and rolled down the window, despite it not being a warm night. Park also testified that he loaded four luggage bags into the car that night, one of them being a knapsack that Simpson would not let him touch, insisting he would load it himself. A porter at the airport testified that Simpson checked only three bags that night, and the police determined that the missing luggage was the same knapsack the limousine driver had mentioned earlier. Another witness not heard at the trial claimed he saw Simpson at the airport discarding items from a bag into a trash can. Detectives Tom Lange and Philip Vannatter believe this is how the murder weapon, shoes and clothes that Simpson wore during the murder were disposed of.

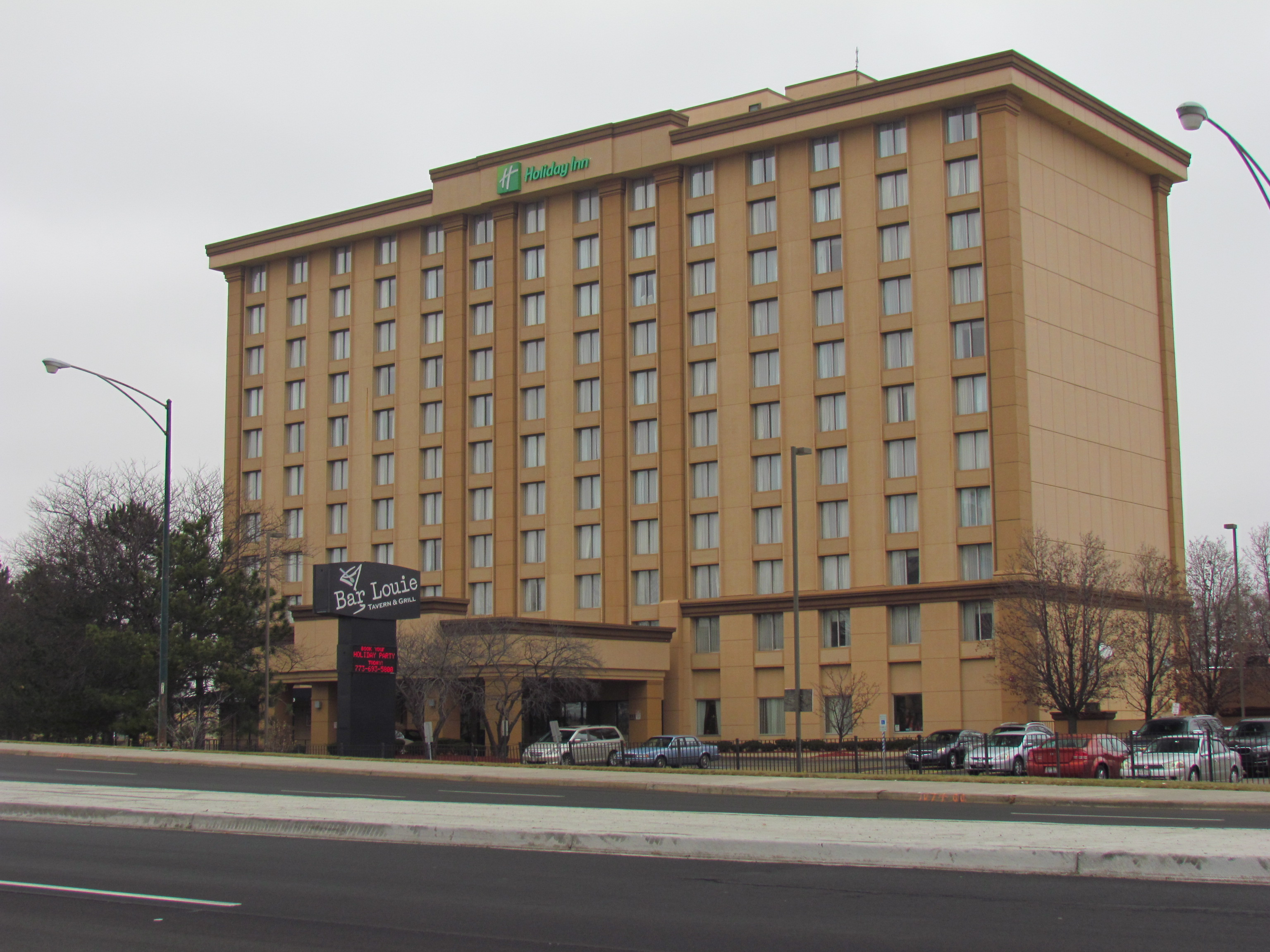
The hotel where Simpson stayed in Chicago, pictured in 2014

Simpson was running late but caught his flight. A passenger on the plane and the pilot testified that they did not notice any cuts or wounds on Simpson's hands. A broken glass, a note with a telephone number on it, and bedsheets with blood on them were all recovered from Simpson's room at the O'Hare Plaza Hotel. The manager of the hotel recalled Simpson asking for a Band-Aid for his finger at the front desk, because he had "cut it on pieces of note paper".

=== Initial investigation and arrest ===
After learning that Brown was the female victim, LAPD commander Keith Bushey ordered detectives Tom Lange, Philip Vannatter, Ron Phillips, and Mark Fuhrman to notify Simpson of her death and to escort him to the police station to pick up the former couple's children, who were asleep in Brown's condominium at the time of the murders. The detectives buzzed the intercom at Simpson's estate for over 30 minutes but received no response. They noted that Simpson's car was parked at an awkward angle, with its back end out more than the front, and that there was blood on the door, which they feared meant someone inside might be hurt. Vannatter instructed Fuhrman to scale the wall and unlock the gate to allow the other three detectives to enter. The detectives would argue they entered without a search warrant because of exigent circumstances – specifically out of fear that someone inside might be injured. Fuhrman briefly interviewed Kaelin, who told the detective that the car belonged to Simpson and that earlier that night he had heard thumps on his wall. In a walk around the premises to inspect what may have caused the thumps, Fuhrman discovered a blood-stained right-hand glove, which was determined to be the mate of the left-hand glove found next to the body of Goldman. This evidence along with the presence of blood in the driveway of the Rockingham estate and on Simpson's vehicle constituted probable cause and a search warrant for the location was applied for and granted.

Phillips testified that when he called Simpson in Chicago to tell him of Brown's murder, Simpson sounded "very upset" but was oddly unconcerned about the circumstances of her death. Simpson only asked if the children had seen the murder or Brown's body, but was not concerned about whether the assailant(s) had harmed the children either. The police contacted Simpson at his home on June 13 and took him to Parker Center for questioning. Lange noticed that Simpson had a cut on a finger on his left hand that was consistent with where the killer was bleeding from, and asked Simpson how he got the cut. At first, Simpson claimed he cut his finger accidentally while in Chicago after learning of Brown's death. Lange then informed Simpson that blood was found inside his car; at this point, Simpson admitted that he had cut his finger on June 12, but said he did not remember how. He voluntarily gave some of his own blood for comparison with evidence collected at the crime scene and was released. On June 14, Simpson hired lawyer Robert Shapiro, who began assembling Simpson's team of lawyers (referred to as the "Dream Team"). Shapiro noted that an increasingly distraught Simpson had begun treatment for depression. The following days, preliminary results from DNA testing came back with matches to Simpson but the District Attorney delayed filing charges until all the results had come back. Simpson spent the night between June 16 and 17 at the San Fernando Valley home of friend Robert Kardashian; Shapiro asked several doctors to attend to Simpson's purported fragile mental state.

On June 17, detectives recommended that Simpson be charged with two counts of first-degree murder with special circumstance of multiple killings after the final DNA results came back and an arrest warrant was subsequently issued. The LAPD notified Shapiro at 8:30 am that Simpson would have to turn himself in that day. At 9:30 am, Shapiro went to Kardashian's home to tell Simpson that he would have to turn himself in by 11:00 am, an hour after the murder charges were filed. Simpson told Shapiro that he wanted to turn himself in, to which the police agreed, believing that someone as famous as Simpson would not attempt to flee. The police agreed to delay Simpson's surrender until noon to allow him to be seen by a mental health specialist, as he was showing signs of suicidal depression – he had updated his will, called his mother and children, and written three sealed letters: one to his children, one to his mother, and one to the public. More than 1,000 reporters waited for Simpson's perp walk at the police station, but he did not arrive as stipulated. The LAPD then notified Shapiro that Simpson would be arrested at Kardashian's home. Kardashian and Shapiro told Simpson this but when the police arrived an hour later, Simpson and Al Cowlings had disappeared. The three sealed letters Simpson had written were left behind. At 1:50 pm, Commander Dave Gascon, LAPD's chief spokesman, publicly declared Simpson a fugitive; the police issued an all-points bulletin for him and an arrest warrant for Cowlings.

==== Purported suicide note ====
At 5 pm, Kardashian and one of his defense lawyers read Simpson's public letter. In the letter, Simpson sent greetings to 24 friends and wrote, "First everyone understand I had nothing to do with Nicole's murder". He described the fights with Brown and their decision not to reconcile their relationship, and asked the media "as a last wish" not to bother his children. He wrote to his former girlfriend Paula Barbieri, who had broken up with him hours before the double murder, "I'm sorry ... we're not going to have, our chance ... [sic] As I leave, you'll be in my thoughts". It also included "I can't go on" and an apology to the Goldman family. The letter concluded, "Don't feel sorry for me. I have had a great life, great friends. Please think of the real O. J. and not this lost person". Most interpreted this as a suicide note; Simpson's mother collapsed after hearing it, and reporters joined the search for Simpson. At Kardashian's press conference, Shapiro said that he and Simpson's psychiatrists agreed with the suicide note interpretation. Through television, Shapiro appealed to Simpson to surrender.

==== Bronco chase ====
Selected key locations of the Bronco chase
1 Simpson's 9-1-1 call is traced to the I-5 Freeway near the Ascension Cemetery in Lake Forest.
2 From a news helicopter, reporter Zoey Tur spots the Bronco near the El Toro Y interchange.
3 Cowlings turns the Bronco west onto the 91 Freeway.
4 The Bronco heads south onto I-110.
5 Cowlings takes I-405 north.
6 Cowlings takes the Sunset Boulevard exit, turning west towards Brentwood.
7 The chase ends at Simpson's Rockingham Avenue estate.

The white Ford Bronco XLT that Cowlings drove in the O.J. Simpson police pursuit, on display at the Alcatraz East museum

News helicopters searched the Los Angeles highway system for Al Cowlings's automobile, a white 1993 Ford Bronco. At 5:51 pm, Simpson reportedly called 9-1-1; the call was traced to the Santa Ana Freeway, near Lake Forest. At around 6:20 pm, a motorist in Orange County notified California Highway Patrol after seeing someone believed to be Simpson in a Bronco on the I-5 freeway heading north. The police tracked calls placed by Simpson on his cell phone. At 6:45 pm, police officer Ruth Dixon saw the Bronco heading north on Interstate 405; when she caught up to it, Cowlings yelled out that Simpson was in the back seat of the vehicle and was pointing a gun at his own head. The officer backed off, but followed the vehicle at 35 miles per hour (56 km/h), with up to 20 police cars following her in the chase. Zoey Tur of KCBS-TV was the first to find Simpson from a news helicopter, after colleagues heard that the FBI's mobile phone tracking had located Simpson at the El Toro Y. More than nine news helicopters eventually joined the pursuit; Tur compared the fleet to Apocalypse Now, and the high degree of media participation caused camera signals to appear on incorrect television channels. The chase was so long that one helicopter ran out of fuel, forcing its station to ask another for a camera feed.

Knowing that Cowlings was listening to KNX-AM, sports announcer Pete Arbogast called Simpson's former USC football coach John McKay and connected him to Simpson. As both men wept, Simpson told McKay, "OK, Coach, I won't do anything stupid. I promise" off the air. "There is no doubt in my mind that McKay stopped O.J. from killing himself in the back of that Bronco", Arbogast said. McKay, Walter Payton, Vince Evans, and others from around the country pleaded with Simpson over radio to surrender.

At Parker Center, officials discussed how to persuade Simpson to surrender peacefully. Lange, who had interviewed Simpson about the murders on June 13, realized he had Simpson's cell phone number and called him repeatedly. A colleague hooked a tape recorder up to Lange's phone and captured a conversation between Lange and Simpson, in which Lange repeatedly pleaded with Simpson to "throw the gun out [of] the window" for the sake of his mother and children. Simpson apologized for not turning himself in earlier that day, and responded he was "the only one who deserved to get hurt" and was "just gonna go with Nicole". Simpson asked Lange to "just let me get to the house" and said "I need [the gun] for me". Cowlings's voice is overheard in the recording (after the Bronco had arrived at Simpson's home surrounded by police) pleading with Simpson to surrender and end the chase peacefully. NBC Sports broadcaster Bob Costas, who had worked with Simpson on the network's NFL studio show, said that during the chase that Simpson had called 30 Rockefeller Plaza in New York City asking to speak to Costas, but Costas was several blocks away at Madison Square Garden covering Game 5 of the 1994 NBA Finals.

Los Angeles streets emptied and drink orders stopped at bars as people watched on television. Every television network showed the chase; ABC, NBC, CBS, CNN, and local news outlets interrupted regularly scheduled programming to cover the incident, watched by an estimated 95 million viewers nationwide; only 90 million had watched that year's Super Bowl. While NBC continued to air NBA Finals coverage, Bob Costas acted as a go-between for Marv Albert, who was calling the game, and Tom Brokaw, who reported on the chase. Both events were carried in a split screen. The chase was covered live by ABC anchors Peter Jennings and Barbara Walters on behalf of the network's five news magazines, which achieved some of their highest-ever ratings that week. The chase was also broadcast internationally, including in France and China.

Thousands of spectators and onlookers packed overpasses along the route of the chase, waiting for Simpson. In a festival-like atmosphere, many held signs urging Simpson to flee, with slogans such as "Go O.J." and "Save the Juice". Encouraging Simpson's actions outraged Jim Hill, who was among those broadcasting pleas to their friend to surrender. As people watched and wondered what would happen to Simpson, one author wrote, "the shared adventure gave millions of viewers a vested interest, a sense of participation, a feeling of being on the inside of a national drama in the making".

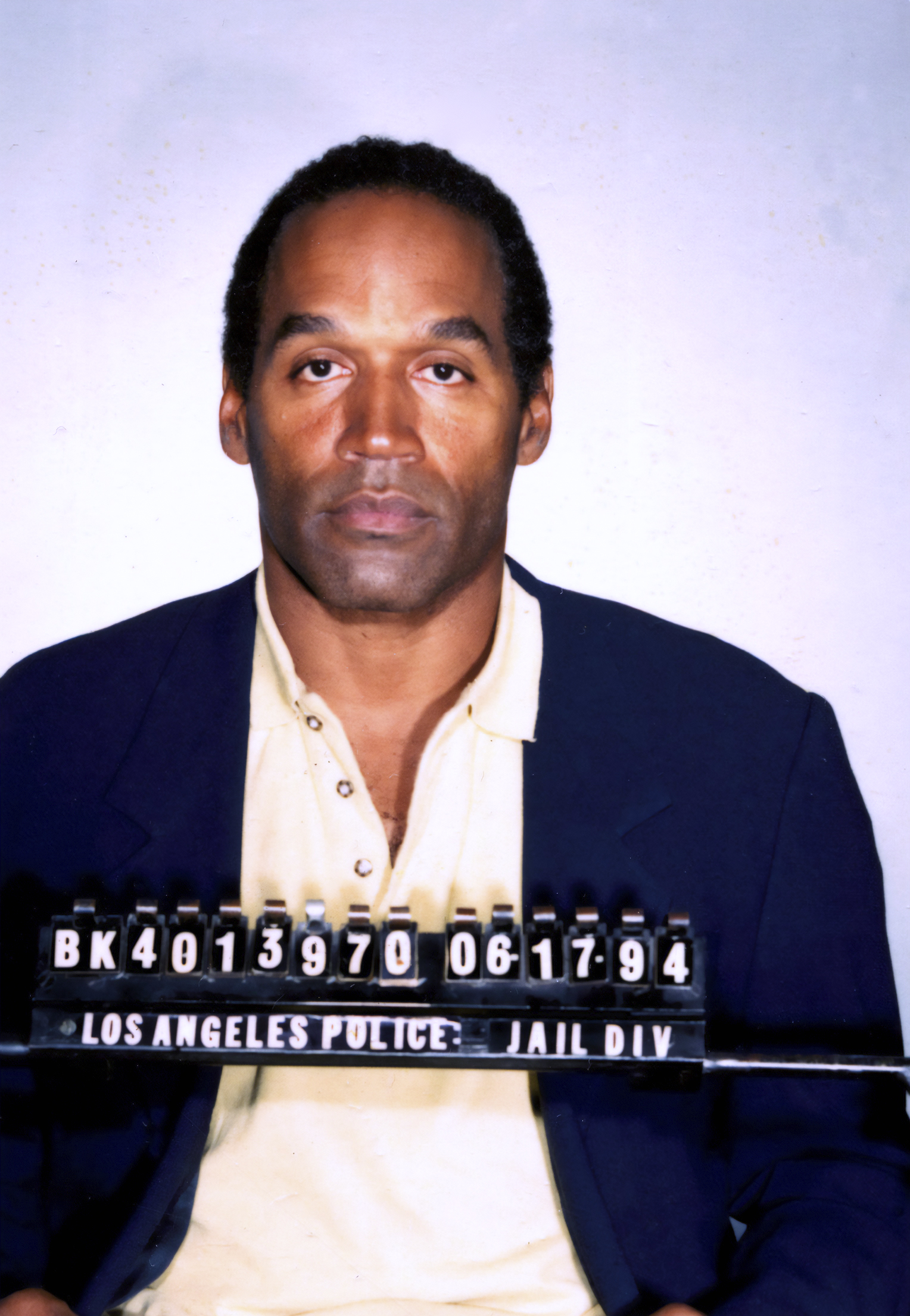
Mugshot of Simpson, June 17, 1994

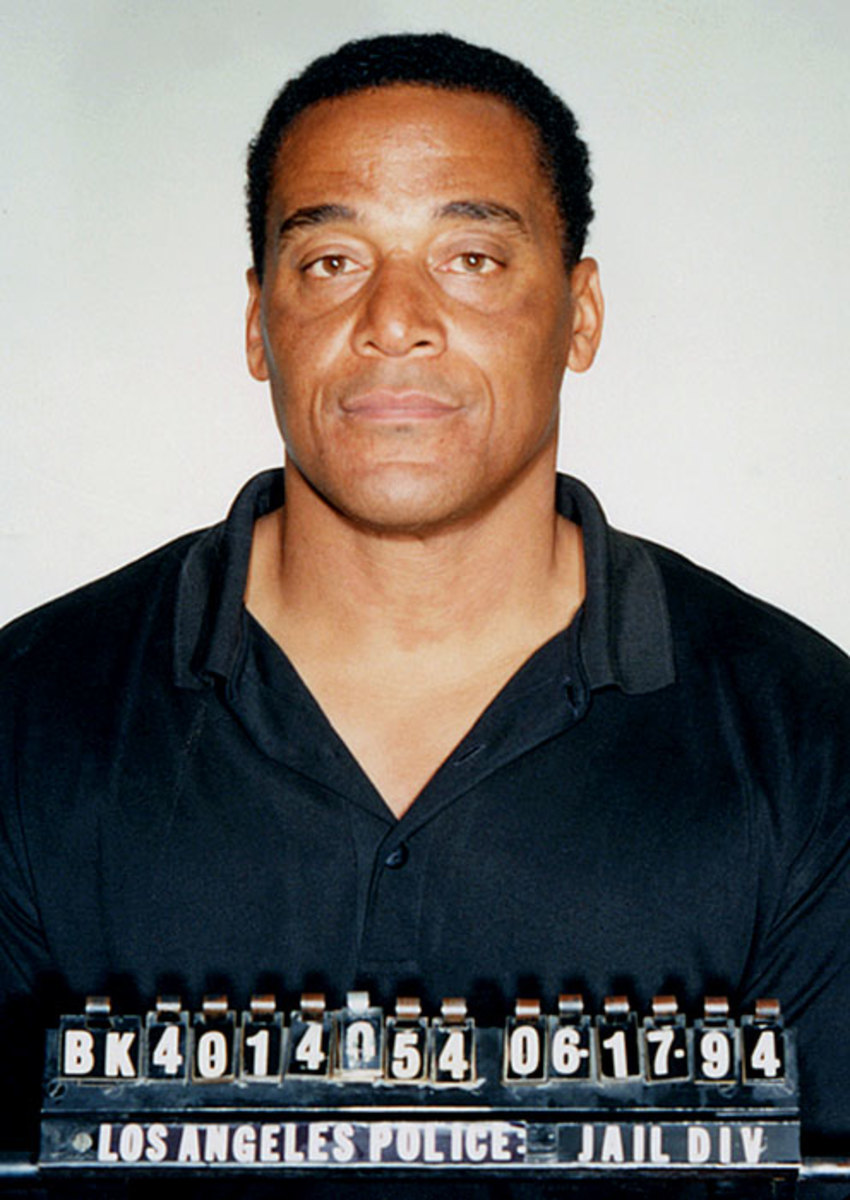
Mugshot of Cowlings, June 17, 1994

Simpson reportedly demanded that he be allowed to speak to his mother before he would surrender. The chase ended at 8:00 pm at his Brentwood estate, where his son, Jason, ran out of the house, and 27 SWAT officers awaited. After remaining in the Bronco for about 45 minutes, Simpson exited at 8:50 pm and went inside for about an hour; a police spokesman stated that during this time Simpson talked to his mother on the phone. Shapiro then arrived, and Simpson surrendered to authorities a few minutes later. In the Bronco, police found "$8,000 in cash, a change of clothing, a loaded .357 Magnum, a United States passport, family pictures, and a disguise kit with a fake goatee and mustache". Simpson was booked at Parker Center and taken to Men's Central Jail; Cowlings was booked on suspicion of harboring a fugitive and held on $250,000 bail. District Attorney Gil Garcetti eventually determined, however, that pending charges against Cowlings would be dropped due to a lack of sufficient evidence.

The Bronco chase, the suicide note, and the items found in the Bronco were not presented as evidence in the criminal trial. Marcia Clark conceded that such evidence did imply guilt yet defended her decision, citing the public reaction to the chase and suicide note as proof the trial had been compromised by Simpson's celebrity status. Most of the public, including Simpson's friend Al Michaels, interpreted his actions as an admission of guilt, yet thousands of spectators were seen expressing sympathy for Simpson and encouraging him to flee from the police.

On August 14, 2017, Cowlings' Bronco used in the chase was featured on Pawn Stars. The vehicle is displayed at the Alcatraz East Crime Museum in Pigeon Forge, Tennessee, along with Ted Bundy's 1968 Volkswagen Beetle in an exhibit of infamous vehicles used in crime.

=== Trial ===
The People of the State of California v. Orenthal James Simpson criminal trial in Los Angeles County Superior Court, saw Simpson tried and acquitted for the murders of Nicole and Ron Goldman. The trial spanned eight months, from January 24 to October 3, 1995.

Though prosecutors argued that Simpson was implicated by a significant amount of forensic evidence, he was acquitted of both murders on October 3. Commentators agree that to convince the jury to acquit Simpson, the defense capitalized on anger among the city's African-American community toward the Los Angeles Police Department (LAPD), which had a history of racial bias and had inflamed racial tensions in the beating of Rodney King and subsequent riots two years prior. The trial is often characterized as the trial of the century because of its international publicity and has been described as the "most publicized" criminal trial in history. Simpson was formally charged with the murders on June 17; when he did not turn himself in at the agreed time, he became the subject of a police pursuit. TV stations interrupted coverage of game 5 of the 1994 NBA Finals to broadcast live coverage of the pursuit, which was watched by around 95 million people. The pursuit and Simpson's arrest were among the most widely publicized events in history.

Simpson was represented by a high-profile defense team, referred to as the "Dream Team", initially led by Robert Shapiro and subsequently directed by Johnnie Cochran. The team included F. Lee Bailey, Alan Dershowitz, Robert Kardashian, Shawn Holley, Carl E. Douglas, and Gerald Uelmen. Simpson was also instrumental in his own defense. While Deputy District Attorneys Marcia Clark, William Hodgman, and Christopher Darden believed they had a strong case, the defense team persuaded the jury there was reasonable doubt concerning the DNA evidence. They contended the blood sample had been mishandled by lab scientists and that the case had been tainted by LAPD misconduct related to racism and incompetence. The use of DNA evidence in trials was relatively new, and many laypersons did not understand how to evaluate it.

The trial was considered significant for the wide division in reaction to the verdict. Observers' opinions of the verdict were largely related to their ethnicity; the media dubbed this the "racial gap". A poll of Los Angeles County residents showed most African Americans thought the "not guilty" verdict was justified while most whites thought it was a racially motivated jury nullification by the mostly African-American jury. Polling in later years showed the gap had narrowed since the trial; more than half of polled Black respondents expressed the belief that Simpson was guilty. In 2017, three jurors who acquitted Simpson said they would still vote to acquit, while one said he would convict.

After the trial, Goldman's father filed a civil suit against Simpson. In 1997, the jury unanimously found Simpson responsible for the deaths of Goldman and Brown. The Goldman family was awarded damages totaling $34 million ($67 million adjusted for inflation), but as of 2024 have received a small portion of that.

== Bibliography ==
- Bailey, F. Lee; Rabe, Jean (2008). When the Husband is the Suspect. New York: Forge. ISBN 978-0765355232.
- Bugliosi, Vincent (1997) [1996]. Outrage: The Five Reasons Why O.J. Simpson Got Away with Murder. New York: Dell Publishing. ISBN 978-0440223825.
- Lange, Tom; Vannatter, Philip; Moldea, Dan E. (1997). Evidence Dismissed: The Inside Story of the Police Investigation of O.J. Simpson. New York: Pocket Books. ISBN 978-0671009595.
- Schuetz, Janice E.; Lilley, Lin S., eds. (1999). The O.J. Simpson Trials: Rhetoric, Media, and the Law. Carbondale, Illinois: Southern Illinois University Press. ISBN 978-0809322817.
- Toobin, Jeffrey (1997). The Run of His Life: The People v. O.J. Simpson. Touchstone Books. ISBN 978-0684842783.
