= NMCP =

NMCP may refer to:

- National Memorial Cemetery of the Pacific
- National Museum of Crime & Punishment
- Naval Medical Center Portsmouth
