= Al Cowlings =

American football player and actor (born 1947)

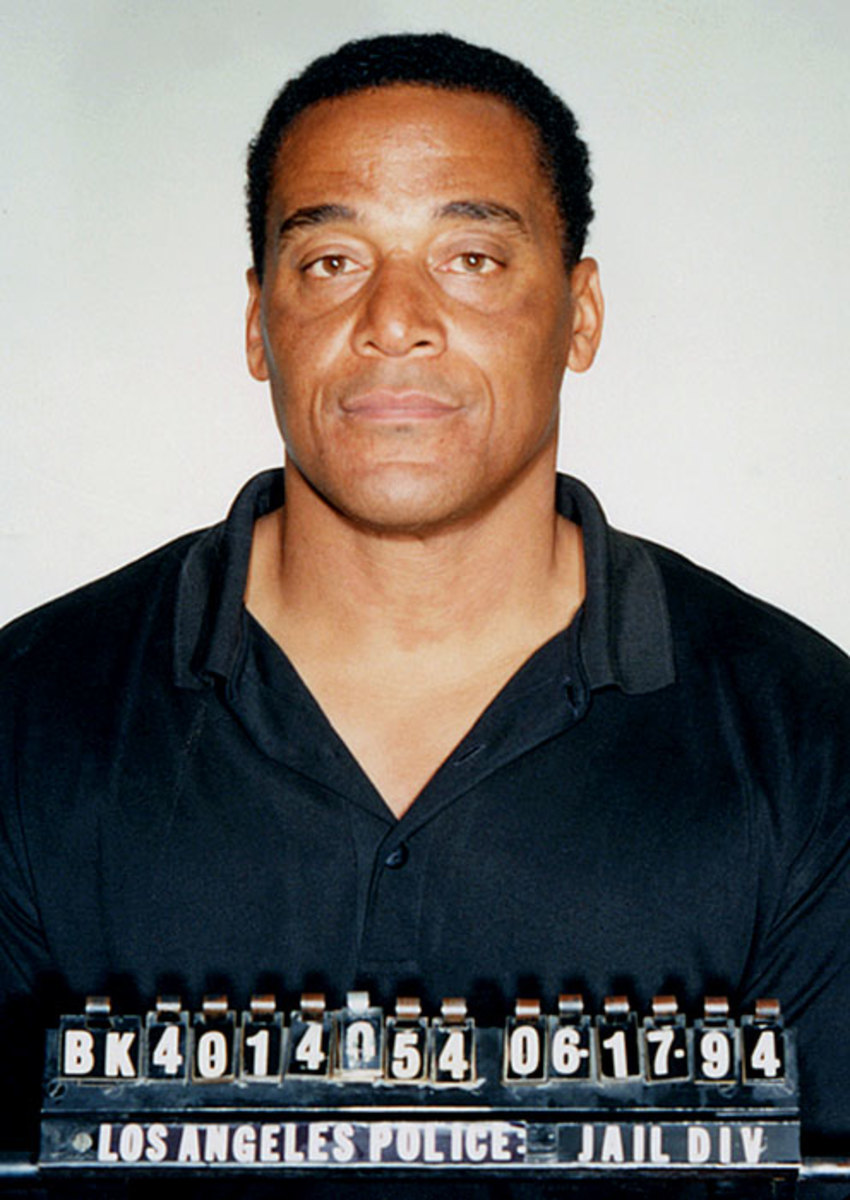
- Mug shot of Cowlings, 1994

No. 82, 76, 70, 72, 79
- Positions: Linebacker, Defensive end, Defensive tackle

Personal information
- Born: June 16, 1947 (age 79); San Francisco, California, U.S.
- Listed height: 6 ft 5 in (1.96 m)
- Listed weight: 255 lb (116 kg)

Career information
- High school: Galileo (San Francisco)
- College: USC (1968–1969)
- NFL draft: 1970: 1st round, 5th overall pick

Career history
- Buffalo Bills (1970–1972); Houston Oilers (1973–1974); Los Angeles Rams (1975); Seattle Seahawks (1976); Los Angeles Rams (1977); Montreal Alouettes (1978); San Francisco 49ers (1979)

Awards and highlights
- First-team All-American (1969); First-team All-Pac-8 (1969); Second-team All-Pac-8 (1968)

Career NFL statistics
- Fumble recoveries: 5
- Sacks: 27.0
- Stats at Pro Football Reference

Other information
- Al Cowlings's voice Cowlings' 911 call during the Bronco chase Recorded June 17, 1994

Allen Cedric Cowlings (born June 16, 1947), nicknamed "A.C.", is an American former professional football player and actor. He played college football for the USC Trojans before being selected fifth overall in the first round by the Buffalo Bills in the 1970 NFL draft. He was a starter at various defensive positions for the Buffalo Bills, Houston Oilers, Los Angeles Rams, Seattle Seahawks, and the San Francisco 49ers, until retiring after the 1979 season.

Cowlings is most famous for his role in aiding his close friend O. J. Simpson in fleeing the police on June 17, 1994, after Simpson was accused of killing his ex-wife Nicole Brown Simpson and her friend Ron Goldman. After leading police on a low-speed chase in his now infamous white Ford Bronco (not to be confused with Simpson's own Ford Bronco, which had traces of the victims' blood and was therefore used as evidence in the trial), Cowlings drove Simpson back to his home where both were arrested—Simpson for murder, and Cowlings for aiding a fugitive—although the charges against Cowlings would later be dropped.

== Early life ==
Cowlings was born on June 16, 1947, in San Francisco, and raised in its Potrero Hill neighborhood. There he was a member of the Superiors social club, which met at the Booker T. Washington Community Center. He attended Galileo High School, where he played football with O. J. Simpson. He and Simpson became friends. After high school, both attended City College of San Francisco, where they played on the football team.

== Football career ==
Cowlings was named an All-American defensive tackle after his senior year at the University of Southern California (USC). During his senior year, the Trojans went undefeated, and Cowlings led a powerful defensive line, nicknamed "The Wild Bunch" after the movie of the same name.

Cowlings was drafted fifth in the first round of the 1970 NFL draft by the Buffalo Bills. He was a starter his first three years in Buffalo, but was traded to Houston Oilers after the 1972 season. He played all 14 games for the Oilers in both 1973 and 1974, but just five games in 1975 for the Rams. In 1976, he became a charter member of the Seattle Seahawks, after being signed off the waiver wire when the Rams released him at the end of the preseason. He played just one game, due to an injury he suffered while playing for the Rams in an exhibition game against the Seahawks. He returned to the Rams in 1977, played with CFL Montreal Alouettes in 1978, and finished his career in 1979 with the San Francisco 49ers.

== Acting career ==
Cowlings's first film role was in the 1985 film Bubba Until It Hurts, starring Bubba Smith. He had a recurring minor role as Coach Nabors in the HBO football sitcom 1st & Ten, which also starred Simpson. Cowlings also served as a technical football advisor on the football scenes in the 1991 Tony Scott film The Last Boy Scout.

== Friendship with O. J. Simpson ==
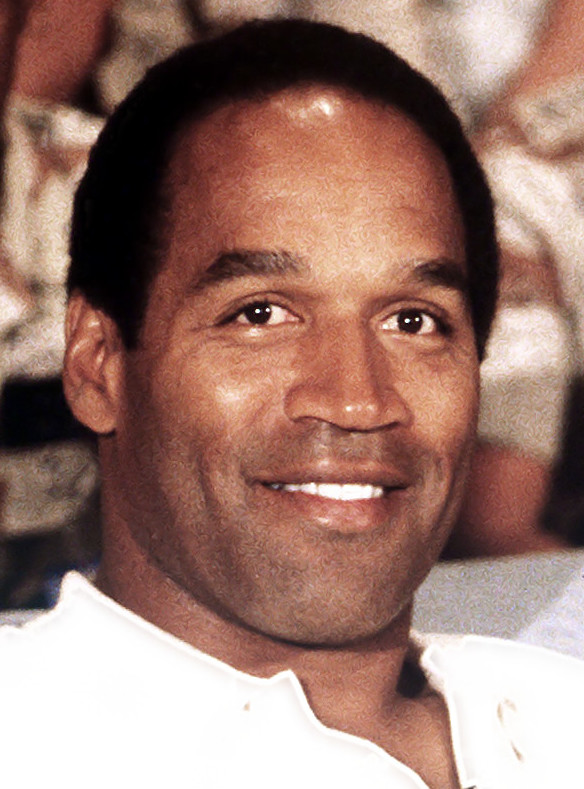
Cowlings was a close friend of O. J. Simpson, whom he had known since childhood

Cowlings was a close friend of O. J. Simpson, whom he had known since childhood. They were teammates at Galileo High School, San Francisco City College, USC, on the Buffalo Bills, and on the San Francisco 49ers. Cowlings dated Simpson's first wife, Marguerite Whitley, while they were attending Galileo High School, and when they were having issues as a couple, Simpson stepped in as a mediator, but the discussion turned into a relationship and they married in 1967; Cowlings was reportedly angry at the time, but he and Simpson would eventually reconcile and resume their friendship. They remained close friends and confidants through the years, with Cowlings being the godfather of Simpson's son Jason and a groomsman at Simpson's and Nicole Brown's wedding in 1985. Cowlings was also the ring bearer at mutual friends Robert and Kris Kardashian's wedding in 1978.

=== Bronco chase ===
The white Ford Bronco XLT that Cowlings drove in the O.J. Simpson police pursuit, on display at the Alcatraz East museum

After the murders of Nicole Brown and her friend Ronald Goldman on June 12, 1994, in which Simpson was a "person of interest," Brown's funeral took place in the St. Martin of Tours Catholic Church in Brentwood on June 16, Cowlings's 47th birthday; Cowlings served as a gatekeeper and pallbearer at the funeral. During the memorial service at David LeBon's house, Cowlings paid his respects to Brown while holding back tears.

Selected key locations of the Bronco chase
1 Simpson's 9-1-1 call is traced to the I-5 Freeway near the Ascension Cemetery in Lake Forest.
2 From a news helicopter, reporter Zoey Tur spots the Bronco near the El Toro Y interchange.
3 Cowlings turns the Bronco west onto the 91 Freeway.
4 The Bronco heads south onto I-110.
5 Cowlings takes I-405 north.
6 Cowlings takes the Sunset Boulevard exit, turning west towards Brentwood.
7 The chase ends at Simpson's Rockingham Avenue estate.

On June 17, despite agreeing to turn himself into the Los Angeles Police Department (LAPD), Simpson failed to surrender at the Parker Center station. Later that day, witnesses reported seeing Simpson riding in a white Ford Bronco, a vehicle owned and being driven by Cowlings, thus becoming the object of a low-speed chase by California Highway Patrol cruisers on the freeways. During the chase, Cowlings made a 911 call from a cell phone and claimed that Simpson was armed with a gun pointed at his own head, demanding that Cowlings drive him to Simpson's estate in Brentwood, or Simpson would kill himself. The pursuit was televised on live TV via helicopter, interrupted coverage of the 1994 NBA Finals, and was viewed by approximately 95 million people in the United States alone. During the chase, an agitated Cowlings famously told 911 dispatchers: "My name is A.C.! You know who I am, goddamn it!" The chase ended at Simpson's Brentwood home, where Simpson surrendered to police after a nearly hour-long wait.

When the chase concluded and Cowlings and Simpson surrendered, Cowlings was arrested and charged with a felony for aiding a fugitive. He was booked into the Los Angeles men's jail, from which he was later released on a $250,000 bond. District Attorney Gil Garcetti eventually determined, however, that pending charges against Cowlings would be dropped due to a lack of sufficient evidence.

In 1994, Cowlings's 1993 Ford Bronco from the low-speed chase was purchased by Simpson's former sports agent Mike Gilbert and two other men, then ended up sitting in a parking garage for the next 17 years (1995–2012), where it was rarely used. As of 2025, the vehicle is on loan to the Alcatraz East Crime Museum, where it was put on display as part of an exhibit on the murder trial.

=== Simpson murder trial ===
During Simpson's criminal trial, Cowlings surprised the media with a press conference held a block from the courthouse. Cowlings retained Beverly Hills public relations firm Edward Lozzi & Associates to conduct the press conference without revealing the reason or itinerary. Lozzi introduced Cowlings and Cowlings's attorney, Donald Re. Cowlings then announced he had created a 900 phone number for the public to ask him questions—about anything except the murder and trial. Cowlings read a one-minute prepared statement announcing the 900 number, which was simultaneously unveiled visually in the room. Reports that Cowlings raised over $1 million from this $2-dollars-plus-a-minute 900 number were never verified. Under oath in his deposition for Simpson's civil trial, Cowlings said that the 900 number endeavor just "broke even." This press conference was the only time Cowlings officially spoke to the media about anything related to the Simpson case. Former porn star and ex-girlfriend Jennifer Peace, who testified before a grand jury, claimed that Cowlings had confessed to her that on the night of the murders, a hysterical Simpson had called him from the airport and that the murder weapon had been disposed of in a airport trash can; Cowlings denied the allegations.

After Simpson's acquittal in October 1995, Fred Goldman, Ron's father, filed a civil suit against Simpson for wrongful death. Cowlings was subpoenaed and during both the deposition and trial took the Fifth Amendment when asked what he was doing between June 13, 1994, when Simpson returned from Chicago, and the freeway chase on June 17, 1994, as he could still be criminally charged for aiding and abetting. But he testified that he had seen Simpson throw out Brown's clothes from their apartment during an argument in 1979 and that while he was driving Brown to a hospital on New Year's Day 1989, she told him Simpson hit her, which (along with Brown's recorded 911 calls, pictures of her with bruises, and similar witness testimony about physical aggression by Simpson against Brown) contradicted Simpson's civil trial testimony that he had never been abusive during their marriage. Cowlings notably broke down in tears after being shown photographs of Nicole's bruised face. Simpson was found liable for both deaths in February 1997.

== Personal life ==
Cowlings is a member of the 2009 USC Athletic Hall of Fame class along with Junior Seau, Rodney Peete, and John Robinson. USC's Cowlings Residential College is named in his honor.

In 2012, Fox News examined the lives of key individuals in the Simpson case and found that Cowlings was reportedly working as a handbag sales representative. In 2014, an ex-teammate told USA Today that Cowlings worked for B. Wayne Hughes, founder of Public Storage. Six months later, USA Today quoted retired tennis player and friend of Cowlings Joe Kolkowitz saying that Cowlings had retired and is still living in Southern California.

In 2016, Cowlings was played by Malcolm-Jamal Warner in the critically acclaimed series The People v. O. J. Simpson: American Crime Story. According to TMZ, during production, Cowlings had reportedly threatened to sue FX if he was portrayed negatively.

In March 2018, O. J. Simpson (after his parole for armed robbery and kidnapping) said that he may have chronic traumatic encephalopathy (CTE), a neurodegenerative disease common in athletes who have suffered numerous head wounds or concussions. Simpson said that close friends and former teammates, including Cowlings, also struggle with the symptoms of CTE.

== Bibliography ==
- "Annual Football Roundup: The Defensive Backs". Ebony. November 1977. p. 163.
- Marcin, Joe; Spink, C.C. Johnson, eds. (1971). Sports News Football register. The Sporting News.
- Rhoden, Bill (November 1974). "Black Quarterbacks: One Foot in the Door". Ebony. pp. 166–181.
- Bugliosi, Vincent (1997). Outrage: The Five Reasons Why O.J. Simpson Got Away with Murder. Island Books. ISBN 978-0-440-22382-5.
