= O. J. Simpson white Bronco chase =

Police chase in Los Angeles, United States

- California Highway Patrol cars trail Cowlings and Simpson in the former's white Ford Bronco on California State Route 91
- Date: June 17, 1994; 32 years ago 5:56 p.m. – 7:57 p.m. (PDT)
- Location: Greater Los Angeles, California, United States
- Caused by: Attempted arrest and charging of O. J. Simpson in the case of the murder of Nicole Brown Simpson and Ron Goldman
- Result: Simpson and Cowlings surrender and are arrested; Simpson is charged with murder; Cowlings is charged with aiding a fugitive

Parties
- Al Cowlings
- O. J. Simpson
- California Highway Patrol
- Los Angeles Police Department
- Orange County Sheriff's Department
- Santa Ana Police Department
- FBI (Note: Uninvolved in pursuit, helped track Simpson's phone when law enforcement was looking for Cowling's Bronco)

Number
Two	Over two dozen

Casualties
- Arrested: Two
- Charged: Simpson (two counts of first-degree murder); Cowlings (one count of aiding a fugitive)
- Aftermath: Simpson brought to trial; Charges against Cowlings dropped

The O. J. Simpson white Bronco chase was a low-speed police chase across Greater Los Angeles on June 17, 1994, involving Al Cowlings and O. J. Simpson—actors, former football players, and childhood friends. It began after the two went missing earlier that day, when the Los Angeles Police Department (LAPD) issued an arrest warrant for Simpson on suspicion that he had committed the recent Los Angeles murders of his ex-wife Nicole Brown Simpson and her friend Ron Goldman. Lasting for roughly two hours, the chase was a media spectacle, and it became an iconic moment in American popular culture.

Simpson and Brown had divorced the prior year, following violent domestic disputes. After Brown and Goldman were fatally stabbed on June 12, Simpson became the primary suspect within the LAPD's investigation, and the department issued his arrest warrant in the early morning of the 17th. After Simpson had his lawyer Robert Kardashian notify the LAPD that he (Simpson) would surrender at the department's Parker Center headquarters in Downtown L.A, he failed to appear there. LAPD officers visited Kardashian's Encino home, where Simpson and Cowlings had stayed the night before. The two were missing, as Simpson was being driven away from public view by Cowlings in the latter's white 1993 Ford Bronco XLT. The LAPD declared Simpson a fugitive, and law enforcement and news media began searching for him and Cowlings. Kardashian then publicly read a statement from Simpson that was widely interpreted to be a suicide note.

Journalist Zoey Tur, flying in a telecopter, found Simpson and Cowlings at the El Toro Y interchange in Orange County, and soon after, California Highway Patrol (CHP) officer Ruth Dixon noticed the two driving on Interstate 405. She drove after them, and Cowlings yelled out to her that Simpson was sitting in the back of the Bronco, holding a gun to his own head; on Interstate 5, Cowlings called 911 to say the same. A team of LAPD, CHP, Orange County Sheriff's Department (OCSD), and Santa Ana Police Department (SAPD) officers chased the car across major L.A. County roads—in order: State Route 91, Interstate 110, Interstate 405, and Sunset Boulevard. Thousands gathered in the surrounding streets to observe the chase, and many cheered Simpson on. Cowlings pulled into Simpsons' estate in Brentwood, where the two surrendered.

At its peak, 22 telecopters were flying above the chase to broadcast live footage to television news stations across the United States. The chase had also begun during Game 5 of the 1994 NBA Finals, and the game broadcast on NBC started showing the game and the chase simultaneously. With ~95 million concurrent viewers, the collective broadcast of the chase was one of the most watched moments in American TV history. The incident greatly influenced cable TV news programming and fueled the similar media spectacle that became of Simpson's 1995 trial, in which he was acquitted on both counts of murder.

== Background ==
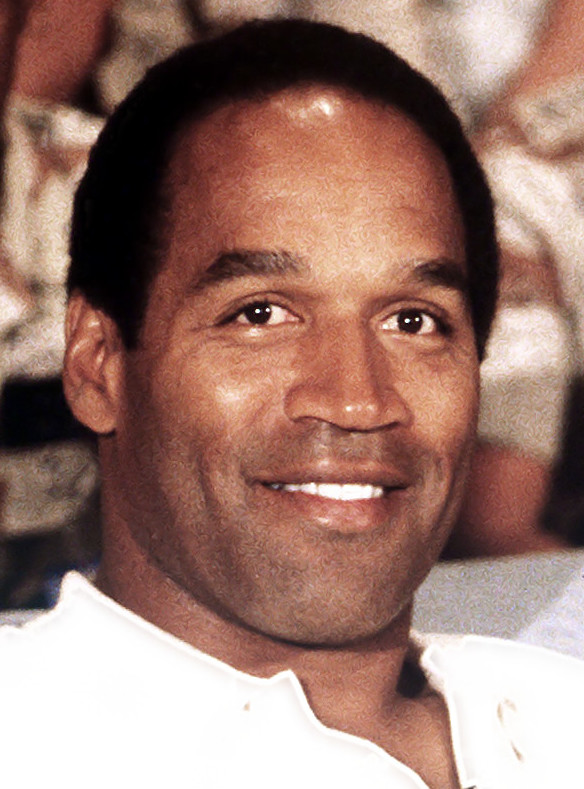
Simpson in 1990

O. J. Simpson was an American football player. Having started playing at Galileo High School in San Francisco, he played at the collegiate level for the University of Southern California's (USC) Trojans and was subsequentially picked first by the Buffalo Bills in the 1969 NFL/AFL draft. Throughout his decade long career in the NFL and AFL, (Note: Simpson participated in the 1969 American Football League season, the last season of the AFL prior to its merger with the NFL.) Simpson demonstrated great talent on the field, and is widely regarded as one of the greatest running backs of all time. Following his retirement in 1979, Simpson had emerged as a prominent cultural figure in America. He indulged in acting, became a sportscaster, and became a spokesman for several brands, most notably Hertz.

Simpson married Marguerite L. Whitley in 1967. A decade later in 1977, Simpson met an 18-year-old German American waitress named Nicole Brown at a Beverly Hills nightclub. The two swiftly began dating, and Simpson and Marguerite divorced in 1979. Simpson and Brown married in 1985. Their relationship, both before and after their marriage was marked with difficulties, with Brown frequently accusing Simpson of domestic abuse. An incident on New Year's Day 1989, where Brown was found by police battered and half-naked, hiding in the bushes following a 911 call where she stated that she thought Simpson was about to kill her, led to Simpson pleading no contest in spousal abuse and being given two years' probation, 120 hours of community service, and forced to donate $500 to a battered women's shelter. Brown divorced Simpson in 1992, citing irreconcilable differences.

On June 12, 1994, Brown and her friend Ron Goldman were found murdered outside the former's Brentwood, Los Angeles condominium. When Simpson was notified of his ex-wife's death, LAPD detective Ron Phillips testified that Simpson appeared upset about the murder, but rather unconcerned about the circumstances of her killing, only seeming to care if the children had seen it or her body. Detectives from the Los Angeles Police Department (LAPD) took Simpson in for questioning on June 13. Detective Todd Lange noticed that Simpson had a cut on a finger on his left hand, consistent to where blood samples from the crime scene indicated that the killer was bleeding from; when asked, Simpson initially stated that he had cut it in distress after learning of Brown's murder. After Lange then told Simpson that the blood had been found in his own car, Simpson then admitted that he had cut his finger on June 12, but could not recall how; he then subsequentially provided a voluntary blood sample. On June 14, Simpson hired Robert Shapiro to be his lawyer, and he began assembling the so-called "Dream Team", or his legal defense team. Preliminary DNA test results in the coming days indicated matches with Simpson, but Gil Garcetti, the Los Angeles County District Attorney, prevented filing charges until all results had come in.

Al Cowlings was a fellow American football player who had befriended Simpson during their time together at Galileo High School. Cowlings had dated Marguerite at Galileo High School, where they had relationship issues; Simpson stepped in initially as a mediator, but the relationship between the latter and Marguerite later evolved into a romantic one. Although this caused a rift between Simpson and Cowlings initially, they later reconciled. They both played for the Trojans at USC and even were a part of some of the same teams on the NFL and AFL. Retiring in 1979, the same year as Simpson, Cowlings also pursued a stint in acting afterwards. Cowlings had attended the funeral of Brown at Ascension Cemetery in Lake Forest on June 16, coincidentally his 47th birthday, where he served as pallbearer and gatekeeper. Simpson had also attended the funeral, despite increasing suspicion regarding his involvement in the double-murder.

== Arrest warrant and initial flight ==
On June 17, the final DNA results came back; subsequentially, Los Angeles Police Department detectives recommended that Simpson be charged with two counts of first-degree murder with special circumstance of multiple killings. An arrest warrant was successively issued and Robert Shapiro was subsequentially informed at 8:30 am (PDT) by the LAPD that Simpson was to turn himself in later that day. An hour later, at 9:30 am, Shapiro went to the house of Robert Kardashian, whose house Simpson had spent the night with Al Cowlings to avoid the media. There, Shapiro informed Kardashian that Simpson needed to surrender by 11:00 am, an hour after the murder charges were filed. Simpson stated that he was willing to surrender. The LAPD, believing someone of his status would not attempt to flee, agreed to delay his surrender in order to allow him to see a mental health specialist; Simpson had begun to exhibit signs of depression and suicidality in the preceding days.

More than 1,000 reporters awaited Simpson for his perp walk at the LAPD Headquarters at Parker Center, but he did not arrive. Afterwards, the LAPD informed Shapiro that Simpson was to be arrested at Kardashian's home. Shapiro and Kardashian relayed this information to Simpson. When the LAPD arrived an hour later, they met Simpson's lawyers, who agreed to facilitate his surrender and accompany him to the LAPD headquarters; however, when one of the physicians present in the house went upstairs to retrieve him, he discovered that Simpson and Cowlings had disappeared. After two hours, the LAPD informed reporters at the headquarters to head inside, where at 1:50 pm, Commander Dave Gascon, LAPD's chief spokesman, publicly declared Simpson a fugitive. The LAPD issued an all-points bulletin for him and an arrest warrant for Cowlings.

=== Purported suicide note ===
As Simpson began to mentally spiral, he began to compose what were interpreted by many to be last messages. He updated his will, called his mother and children, and wrote three sealed letters: one to his children, one to his mother, and one to the public. When Cowlings and Simpson embarked upon their flight, the three sealed letters were left behind at Kardashian's house. At 5:00 pm, Kardashian and one of his defense lawyers read the letter addressed to the public. In it, Simpson declared that he had nothing to do with Brown's murder. He described the fights with Brown and the collapse of their relationship. He implored the media to not bother his children as a "last wish". He wrote to his ex-girlfriend Paula Barbieri, who had broken up with him hours preceding the murder of Brown and Goldman, "I'm sorry ... we're not going to have, our chance ... [sic] As I leave, you'll be in my thoughts." Declaring that he "can't go on," he apologized to the Goldman family and concluded with "Don't feel sorry for me. I have had a great life, great friends. Please think of the real O. J. and not this lost person."

The white Ford Bronco XLT that Cowlings drove in the police pursuit, on display at the Alcatraz East museum

The letter was widely interpreted as a suicide note; Simpson's mother collapsed after hearing it and reporters joined the search for Simpson. Shapiro stated at Kardashian's press conference that he and Simpson's psychiatrists agreed with the interpretation that it was a suicide note. Appealing to Simpson via TV, he urged the latter to surrender. Law enforcement and media personnel began searching for Simpson across Greater Los Angeles, initially believing that he was hiding out in another home. Unbeknownst to them at the time, Simpson and Cowlings had entered into a white 1993 Ford Bronco XLT recently bought by the latter, and were driving along Interstate 405, with Cowlings in the driver's seat and Simpson in the passenger seat. Simpson had planned to go to the Ascension Cemetery in Lake Forest, where the late Brown had been buried just a day earlier, but they were prevented from entering by a police car that cordoned off the entrance. Cowlings parked the Bronco nearby, with Simpson wanting to wait out the police car. While parked, the two listened in on the radio, where they became aware of the large-scale search for them; in response, Simpson moved from the passenger seat to the back of the vehicle. Now lying in the back, at around 4 pm, he then proceeded to instruct Cowlings to head to his Brentwood estate, where he wished to meet his mother.

Knowing that he was the target of a large and well-known search, Simpson called 911 directly at 5:51 pm. Law enforcement traced the call to the Santa Ana Freeway. At around 6:20 pm, a driver in Orange County notified the California Highway Patrol (CHP) of someone believed to be Simpson in a Bronco heading north on Interstate 5. The law enforcement continued tracing Simpson's calls; phone-tracking from the FBI determined that the Bronco was around the El Toro Y interchange between Interstate 405 and Interstate 5.

== Chase ==
Selected key locations of the Bronco chase
1 Simpson's 9-1-1 call is traced to the I-5 Freeway near the Ascension Cemetery in Lake Forest.
2 From a news helicopter, reporter Zoey Tur spots the Bronco near the El Toro Y interchange. Within seconds, Ruth Dixon becomes the first law enforcement official to approach it.
3 Cowlings turns the Bronco west onto the 91 Freeway.
4 The Bronco heads south onto I-110.
5 Cowlings takes I-405 north.
6 Cowlings takes the Sunset Boulevard exit, turning west towards Brentwood.
7 The chase ends at Simpson's Rockingham Avenue estate.

At 6:45 pm, CHP patrol officer Ruth Dixon became the first to detect the white Bronco, seeing it heading north on Interstate 405. As she approached the Bronco, which had stopped, Cowlings emerged from the window banging the side of the vehicle, yelling out that Simpson was in the car and had a gun to his head. Dixon backed off, but continued pursuing the Bronco at 35 miles per hour (56 km/h); she would go on to be joined by over 20 police vehicles from the Santa Ana Police Department (SAPD), the LAPD, the Orange County Sheriff's Department (OCSD), and the CHP over the course of the chase.

Cowling's 911 call.

Cowlings drove slowly along Interstate 5, going only around 30 miles per hour (48 km/h). The slow speed of the pursuit, compounded with the fact that new cars could not come from behind due to the police cars, meant that traffic was cleared out on I-405 northbound. Cowlings phoned 911 once again, where he attempted to negotiate with law enforcement. In this call, which he abruptly ended, he once again reiterated that Simpson had a gun to his head. With a possible suicide by Simpson on the table, the LAPD made a request to the news choppers overhead broadcasting the pursuit to get a closer look inside the white Bronco, so that a confirmation could be made on whether Simpson indeed had a gun. During the call, Cowlings famously angrily responded to the initial transponder when he asked for his name, exclaiming "My name is AC – you know who I am goddammit!"

Dashcam footage from an Orange County Sheriff's Department vehicle of the pursuit on I-405. The white Bronco can be seen on the left in the foreground.

The white Bronco then left I-5, turning onto California State Route 91. With huge news coverage of the event, many personalities attempted to reach Simpson to implore him to surrender. These included football players Walter Payton, and Vince Evans, as well as Simpson's former USC coach John McKay. Knowing that Cowlings was listening to KNX-AM, sports announcer Pete Arbogast contacted McKay and connected him to Simpson. After a teary exchange, Simpson later promised McKay off the air that he "won't do anything stupid." Arbogast later declared that there was "no doubt in my mind that McKay stopped O.J. from killing himself in the back of that Bronco." NBC Sports broadcaster Bob Costas, who had worked with Simpson on the network's NFL studio show, said that during the chase that Simpson had called 30 Rockefeller Plaza in New York City asking to speak to Costas, but Costas was several blocks away at Madison Square Garden covering Game 5 of the 1994 NBA Finals.

The white Bronco eventually left State Route 91, where Cowlings then briefly entered Interstate 110 before re-entering I-405. At Parker Center, officials discussed how to persuade Simpson to surrender peacefully. Todd Lange, recalling his interview of Simpson on June 13, remembered that he had obtained Simpson's cell phone number at the time. Knowing that Simpson had his cell phone on him, and was using it to make contact with people outside the Bronco, Lange began phoning him repeatedly.

Call between Simpson and Lange. Cowlings and Simpson's son, Jason, can be heard at the end of the recording.

Simpson eventually picked up the phone. A colleague of Lange hooked a tape recorder up to Lange's phone and captured a conversation between Lange and Simpson. Throughout the call, Lange repeatedly implored Simpson to "throw the gun out [of] the window" for the sake of his family. Simpson apologized for not turning himself in earlier that day, and responded he was "the only one who deserved to get hurt" and was "just gonna go with Nicole". Simpson asked Lange to "just let me get to the house" and said "I need [the gun] for me". As the Bronco headed towards Simpson's home in Brentwood, it exited I-405 and entered into the city streets of Los Angeles from the Sunset Boulevard exit. At this point, Cowlings began to speed and blow through several red lights. Throughout the call, Lange made personal appeals to Simpson, referring to him by his football nickname "Juice". Simpson demanded that he be able to speak to his mother before surrendering.

== Arrival at Brentwood and subsequent surrender ==
Dashcam footage from an OCSD car, showing the end of the chase as Cowlings and Simpsons arrive at the latter's Brentwood estate. Jason is the individual in the white shirt seen running at the start and end of the clip.

At 7:57 pm, the white Bronco pulled into the driveway of Simpson's Rockingham Avenue house in Brentwood, Los Angeles. 27 LAPD SWAT officers awaited the duo at the estate, with snipers covering the property and roof. At that moment, Simpson's son, Jason, after nearly being hit by a journalist's car, ran straight towards the car and began shouting at the driver's seat. Worried that he could further escalate the situation, LAPD officers dragged Jason inside of the house. Cowlings' voice can be overheard in the recording of Simpson's call with Lange, pleading with the former to surrender and end the chase peacefully without committing any acts of self-harm.

Negotiations between the LAPD and the two continued for an additional fifteen minutes. Eventually, an agreement was reached where Simpson was to surrender, but only on his conditions. At 8:50 pm, he left the white Bronco and headed inside the house, where he met his lawyers. Simpson drank a glass of orange juice and had a call with his mother. Following the call, Simpson surrendered to authorities after Shapiro arrived. He and Cowlings were transported to Parker Center, where they were booked; following Simpson's arrival at 9:57 pm, he was sent afterwards to Men's Central Jail. Cowlings was threatened with a charge of aiding a fugitive and held on $250,000 bail; however, District Attorney Gil Garcetti eventually determined, however, that pending charges against Cowlings would be dropped due to a lack of sufficient evidence.

Inside the white Bronco, police found "$8,000 in cash, a change of clothing, a loaded .357 Magnum, a United States passport, family pictures, and a disguise kit with a fake goatee and mustache." The evidence appeared to indicate that Simpson may have been attempting to flee the country.

== Media coverage and popular reaction ==
As it became apparent that Cowlings and Simpson were on the run, news choppers soared the skies of Greater Los Angeles, searching for the white Bronco on the Los Angeles highway system. One of these was Robert Tur of KCBS-TV. Nicknamed "Chopper Bob", and a self-proclaimed adrenaline junkie, he was a helicopter pilot and reporter that had co-founded the Los Angeles News Service in 1979 with his then-wife Marika Gerard; together, the two would provide aerial news coverage to TV stations across Los Angeles. The Turs were pioneers of aerial helicopter news coverage, being known for having filmed the notable beating of truck driver Reginald Denny during the Rodney King riots in 1992. Having an extensive contact network, they were swiftly able to break news about Brown and Goldman's murders on June 13. Tur was among the hundreds of reporters at Parker Center waiting for Simpson's perp walk earlier on the day of the chase. When it became apparent that Simpson was on the loose, he and his wife contacted KCBS and KNX to find Simpson. Believing Simpson to be a "narcissist", he figured that he would be at Brown's burial site in Lake Forest. Tur flew to the Ascension Cemetery, but did not find the Bronco, only noticing a patrol vehicle; the same patrol vehicle had caused Cowlings and Simpson to drive past the cemetery while en route to Brown's grave moments earlier.

Tur then overheard on the police radio that someone had reported seeing Cowlings in a white Bronco. After finding out that the FBI had triangulated him to the El Toro Y, Tur flew to the interchange, where he became the first to detect the white Bronco; within seconds, CHP officer Ruth Dixon had approached it on Interstate 405. As more officers approached, Tur began to air the chase on live television. Initially going to KCBS's national affiliate, CBS, with Dan Rather, Tur's broadcast of the chase was swiftly used unauthorized by various other outlets. Tur was the sole broadcaster of the chase for 25 minutes as other outlets attempted to get their own news helicopters in the air; to maintain his monopoly on the story for as long as possible, he gave purposely deceptive and false position reports on his frequency.

More than 22 helicopters eventually joined in the chase overhead, broadcasting the low-speed pursuit across America. Tur would go on to compare the fleet of helicopters to the 1979 film Apocalypse Now, and the high degree of broadcasting activity caused frequent co-channel interference. The LAPD, unable to get a closer look inside of the Bronco, took advantage of the large amount of aerial recording by attempting to get news stations to film the inside of the car as much as possible, so that they could confirm if Simpson had a gun on him. The chase was long enough to the point that a KABC-TV helicopter was forced to land after depleting its fuel supply, forcing its station to ask KTLA for a live feed.

During the pursuit, NBC (seen here through its local Los Angeles affiliate of KNBC) was forced to broadcast split screen, with often muted coverage of the NBA finals alongside coverage of the Bronco.

June 17 was a Friday, which meant that several major sports events were occurring on that day, especially during the evening; the first game of the 1994 FIFA World Cup was that day, as well as that year's NBA Finals and Arnold Palmer's final US Open round. The 1994 MLB season was also ongoing, with the Seattle Mariners' Ken Griffey Jr. becoming alongside Babe Ruth the only player to hit 30 home runs before June 30 in a game against the Kansas City Royals. As a result, television viewership was already high. Every television network showed the chase; CNN, ABC, NBC, CBS, and local news outlets interrupted regularly scheduled programming to cover the pursuit. In a particularly infamous incident, NBC partially interrupted its programming for the NBA Finals between the New York Knicks and Houston Rockets, covering both the game and the chase via split-screen, with Marv Albert and Tom Brokaw covering both respectively while Bob Costas acted as a go between. Word of Simpson's flight reached Madison Square Garden, where the game was being played, and Rockets players were even able to see glimpses of the pursuit on courtside televisions until their head coach Rudy Tomjanovich put a stop to it. Knicks head coach Pat Riley, who was asked about Simpson's arrest at the end of the game by a drunk fan who had managed to get into the press conference, was alleged by Knicks assistant coach Jeff Van Gundy to have been told by Cowlings that he had driven slowly in part so that Simpson could hear the end of the game. Many fans were outraged at NBC that they had interrupted broadcast of the finals to highlight the Bronco chase, though many spectators at Madison Square Garden paid as much attention to the pursuit via the TVs present at the venue than the game they were physically watching.

An estimated 95 million viewers watched the pursuit across the United States, surpassing that year's Super Bowl by around 5 million and making the white Bronco chase one of the top viewed broadcasts in American history; it contemporarily ranked number 6. ABC's Peter Jennings' and Barbara Walters' coverage of the chase on behalf of the network's five news magazines resulted in them achieving some of their highest ever ratings that week. Larry King, who covered the chase for CNN, described the pursuit as his most dramatic on the air. The chase was also broadcast internationally in countries such as Canada and France.

CBS News coverage of bystanders watching the chase on Interstate 405. The Bronco can be seen on the far left.

Los Angeles' streets emptied and drinks and orders stopped at bars as viewers gazed upon the television. With so many eyes glued to the chase via screens, people settled in and treated it like any other big televised event; Domino's Pizza broke its daily sales record at the time, with activity being compared to that of those expected during the Super Bowl. Thousands of spectators and onlookers packed Los Angeles' overpasses, freeways, on-ramps and streets along the route of the pursuit, eager to see the white Bronco. The scene was festivalesque, with many onlookers cheering Simpson on and urging him to flee. Years earlier, Simpson's advertisement campaign for Hertz had him appear in commercials running in an airport while bystanders cheer "go O. J., go:" onlookers repeated this phase verbally and on signs during the pursuit, as well as other slogans such as "Save the Juice." The popular encouragement of Simpson and Cowlings enraged sportscaster and ex-football player Jim Hill, who was one of a myriad of Simpson's friends pleading with him to surrender peacefully. Some onlookers would later state that the seeming encouragement they gave to Simpson was more so encouragement to surrender, rather than a direct claim of innocence. Most of the public, including Simpson's friend Al Michaels, interpreted his actions as an admission of guilt. Still, thousands of onlookers expressed genuine sympathy for Simpson as they encouraged him to evade law enforcement. An OCSD officer would later state that he was unaware of the media coverage and was confused by the onlookers as he pursued the Bronco.

A large, boisterous crowd congregated at Sunset Boulevard and Rockingham Avenue near Simpson's Brentwood estate as the Bronco arrived, with many cheering "Free O. J." Around fifty youths attempted to climb over the ivy-covered hillside leading to the mansion, but they were repelled by police. As people watched and wondered what would happen to Simpson, one author wrote, "the shared adventure gave millions of viewers a vested interest, a sense of participation, a feeling of being on the inside of a national drama in the making." Legal expert Marcellus McRae in 2014 interview stated that viewers were hypnotized by the chase since "it's not Hollywood, it's real life and it's someone that you actually know," adding that "Regardless of who you are, what your socio-economic background is, whether you are male or female, if you are black or white or Latino, you were riveted by what was happening."

Tur pursued Simpson all the way to his Brentwood estate, where he remained live for an additional three and a half hours to capture his surrender. They followed him as he was being transited to Parker Center; Tur stated that the other news helicopters only realized that Simpson was no longer present at the house until they were halfway there. Tur covered Simpson's entry into Parker Center, as well as his return to his house, where they apparently observed him through a special gyro-stabilized camera system watching an Inside Edition episode about himself.

== Aftermath ==
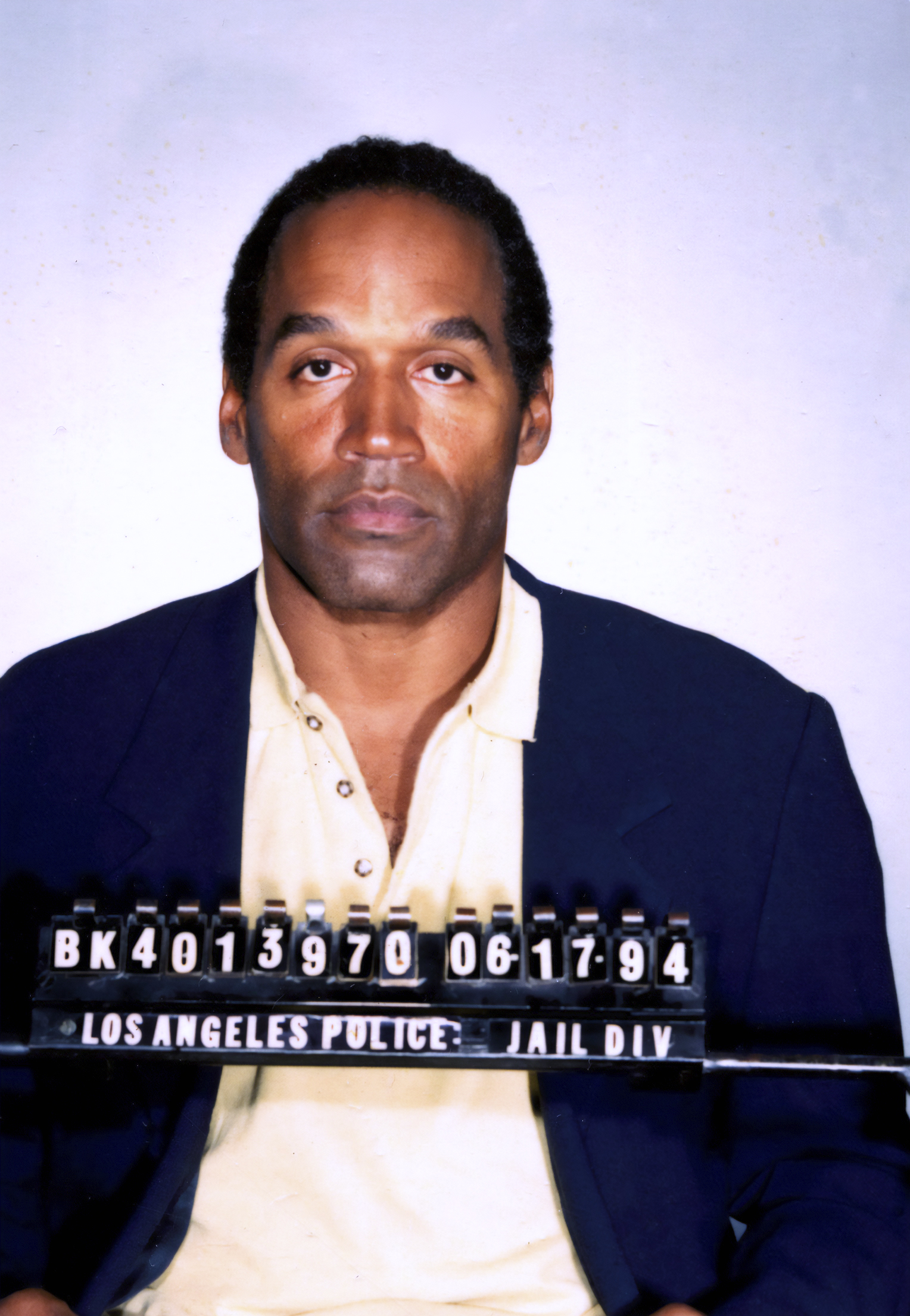
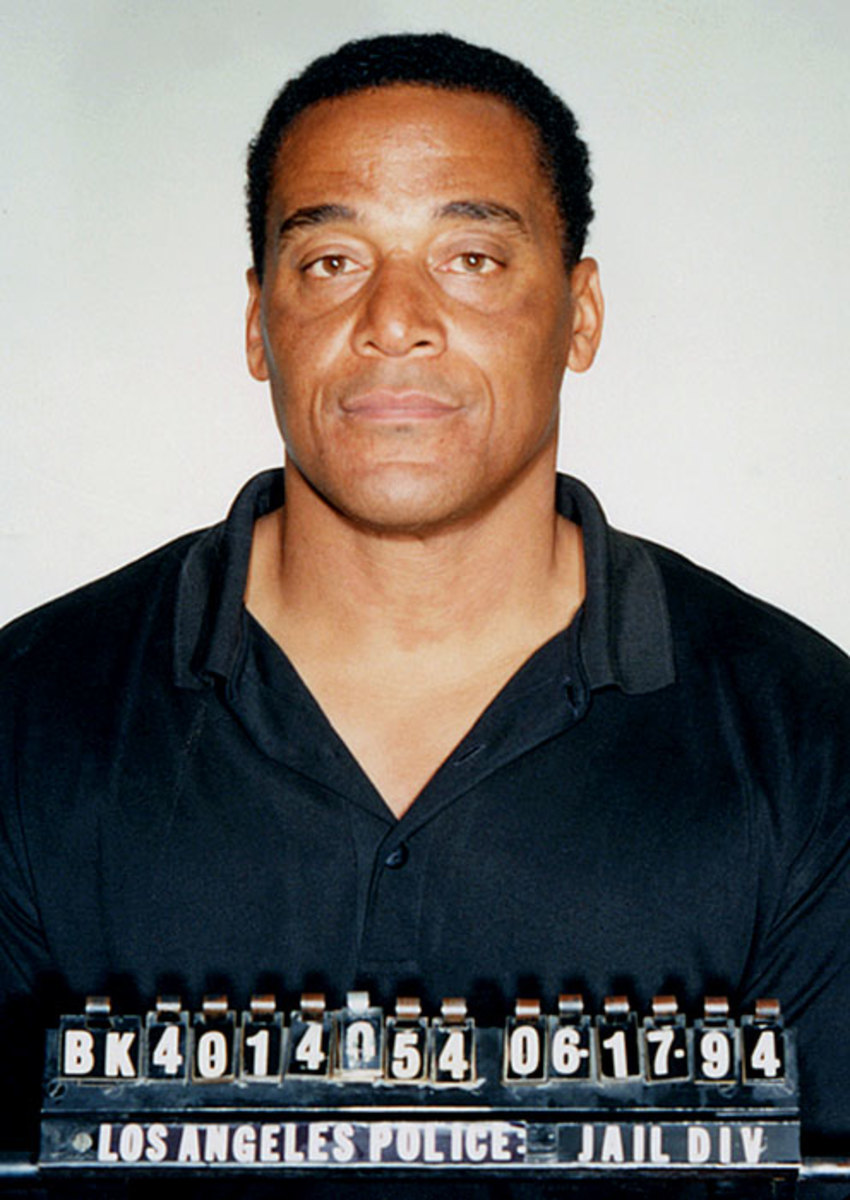
Mugshots of Simpson and Cowlings respectively, taken on the night of their arrest.

After Simpson was charged, he was put to trial over his alleged involvement in the double murder. Simpson's trial started on January 24, 1995, and lasted for over eight months. Dubbed the "trial of the century", riding off the coattails of the Bronco chase, the event received widespread international publicity, with the verdict on October 3 garnering over 150 million live viewers in the United States, an over 50% increase from the viewership of the Bronco chase. Shapiro and Kardashian would go on to be a part of Simpson's legal team, initially led by the former and later by Johnnie Cochran; Simpson would also play a major role in his own defense. The prosecution initially expected an easy win, but the defense was able to persuade the jury that there was reasonable doubt concerning the DNA evidence, which had only just started to be used in the legal system and were not fully understood by laymen; they were also widely believed to have capitalized on racial animus within the majority-black jury stemming from longstanding racial tensions between black Angelenos and the LAPD that had culminated in the riots following the beating of Rodney King. Ultimately, in a surprise upset, Simpson was acquitted of murder. The Bronco chase, the suicide note, and the items found in the Bronco were not presented as evidence in the criminal trial. Deputy District Attorney Marcia Clark, the lead prosecutor in the case, conceded that such evidence did imply guilt yet defended her decision, citing the public reaction to the chase and suicide note as proof the trial had been compromised by Simpson's celebrity status. Simpson would later go on to be tried in a separate civil case filed by families of Goldman and Brown in 1997, where he was found criminally liable for their deaths and forced him to pay $33.5 million to their families; when he died in 2024, he had not fully paid these out, having largely ignored doing so, and the interest on them had grown up to $100 million. He subsequentially declared bankruptcy and moved to Florida. Exactly thirteen years following his acquittal in the original 1995 case, Simpson would be convicted of robbery in Las Vegas on October 3, 2008, and was subsequentially incarcerated on a 33-year-long sentence; he was released on parole in 2017. Simpson died on April 11, 2024, following a battle with prostate cancer. Having maintained his innocence since the murder, the deaths of one of the most polarizing figures in American popular culture was met with mixed reactions.

After Cowling's charges were dropped, he maintained a low profile until Simpson's trial. During it, he held a somewhat impromptu press conference, accusing the media of sensationalizing the trial and announced the creation of a 900 phone number for the public to ask him questions except anything pertaining to the double murder and subsequent trial. Reports claimed that he made over $1 million from this number, which costed $2.99 per minute, however, these were never verified. The press conference is the only time Cowlings has ever spoken to the media directly about the Simpson case. During the subsequent civil case, Cowlings was subpoenaed. He pled the Fifth when asked about his activities between Simpson's return from Chicago on June 13 and the Bronco chase, but later gave details in his testimony about Simpson's abuse towards Brown. Afterwards, Cowlings kept a low profile; as of a 2014 USA Today report, he was still living in Southern California and had retired.

=== Fate of the white Bronco ===
"The White Bronco"
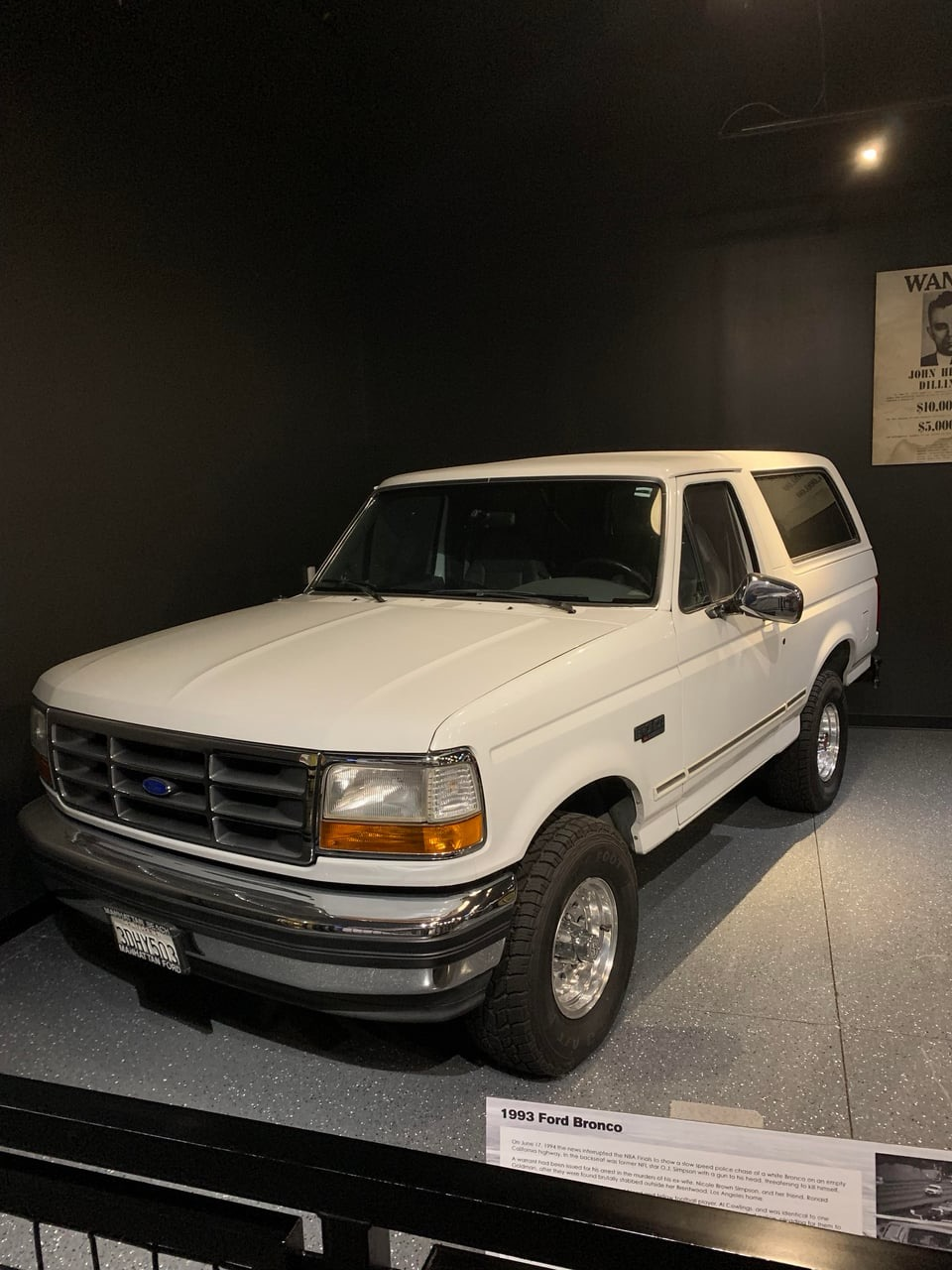
- The Bronco at Alcatraz East in 2022

Overview
- Type: 1993 Ford Bronco XLT
- Manufacturer: Ford Motor Company
- Production: March 1993
- Model years: 1993

Body and chassis
- Class: Full-size SUV
- Body style: 2-door SUV
- Related: Ford Bronco

Powertrain
- Engine: V8

The two-doored, V8 engine white Bronco instantly became a cultural icon. Simpson's agent, Mike Gilbert, declared in a 2016 ESPN interview that "after the limo that JFK was shot in, this is the second-most-viewed car in American history." The car as such swiftly became a huge potential investment. It was seized by police immediately afterwards, but swiftly returned to Cowlings, though in light of the events surrounding the vehicle, he was not eager to drive in it again, and sought to sell it off.

After the chase, but before the trial, a Minnesota company named Startifacts, founded by a certain Michael Kronick, had offered to pay Cowlings $75,000 in exchange for the Bronco and 250 autographed photos of him driving it. A deal was initially struck; however, it was discovered that the company intended to rent out the white Bronco to a Los Angeles company called Grave Line Tours. The latter company visited famous graves, and was apparently planning to re-enact the chase with the white Bronco before taking people to Brown's grave. Not wanting to create the impression that anyone associated with Simpson was connected to such an act, especially prior to the trial, Cowlings canceled a planned November 2, 1994 meeting to finalize the sale, and the Bronco was instead sold by Cowlings to Gilbert, pornographer Michael Pulwer, and an additional anonymous friend for the same price. Kronick later took Cowlings to court in Los Angeles County, but the two settled out of court in 1996. Pulwer kept the car under wraps in his underground garage at his Wilshire Corridor condominium for seventeen years. The three co-owners rarely spoke of the car, and were not particularly interested in selling it off. By 2016, the highest price offered for the Bronco was $275,000, in large part due to how low-profile the three kept the fact of their possession; by that same year, it had not seen more than 20 miles of mileage since the pursuit according to Gilbert. Despite this, Gilbert did keep the gas that was present in the vehicle immediately after the chase, and retained the old tires.

In 2012, a man connected to the Luxor Las Vegas hotel discovered the Bronco parked in a garage without its license plates, covered in black dust, and with flat tires after acting on a tip regarding its location. The owners agreed to loan the vehicle to the Las Vegas casino hotel with additional compensation, where it was displayed for a few months to promote a sports memorabilia exhibit named Score!; (Note: Commonly, though not always stylized as SCORE!) it was also briefly displayed at The Brant Foundation Art Study Center in Greenwich, Connecticut, where it was featured as part of Nate Lowman's exhibit, who had used a topless photo of Brown in his work. The car was later given back since the specific deal stipulated that it needed to be placed inside the hotel exhibit, which required disassembly. Afterwards, the Bronco was moved to a Las Vegas parking lot before being parked in the garage of Gilbert's Hanford, California house in 2015.

At the time, ESPN was making a documentary about the life and legal history of O. J. Simpson dubbed O.J.: Made in America, and Gilbert capitalized on the increased interest coming from it to sell the Bronco. Gilbert made an appearance on a 2017 episode of the History Channel's Pawn Stars, where he attempted to sell it for $1 million; after only managing to get an offer worth half his proposed price, he instead partnered that year with the Alcatraz East Crime Museum in Pigeon Forge, Tennessee, where it has been ever since.

The Ford Bronco brand of cars was rolled out in 1966, as one of the first sport utility vehicles (SUVs). Fitting into a broader outdoorsy aesthetic popular during the time, Ford marketed not only to hunters and fishermen, but also families engaging in outdoor recreation. At the time, it was seen as superior to other competitors, such as the Jeep CJ-5 and International Scout. Unlike these, the Bronco had a hardtop, heating, and possibly even an in-built radio. Over time, the model shifted less away from being for the outdoorsy and more for settled suburbanites. Cowling's had been manufactured in March 1993, and he bought it the following month. Simpson himself owned a white Bronco, often mistaken as the one being driven during the chase; in actuality, it was a separate one granted to him by Hertz while he served as spokesman for the company. Simpson's Bronco was found with Goldman's and Brown's blood on it on June 13; as a result of its use as evidence in the double murder, it was subsequentially impounded and destroyed following the trial. The Ford Bronco became closely associated with the whole ordeal following the pursuit; it has variously been attributed to either increasing sales for the car or hastening its demise. In an Associated Press interview in 2024, shortly after Simpson's death, auto historian Todd Zuercher stated that the Ford Bronco was already on its way out at the time of the Simpson chase, being unable to compete with four-door models that were more family friendly. Nevertheless, two years after the Bronco chase, the model line was discontinued by Ford; the company denied that the cancelation was related to the pursuit. The Bronco line would remain discontinued for 25 years, until 2021, when its sixth generation was rolled out. Coincidentally, the company initially scheduled the unveiling for the new Bronco to be on July 9, 2020, Simpson's birthday; following widespread media coverage of the decision, the company moved the date to July 13, denying any intentionality.

== Legacy ==
With over 95 million live viewers, the Bronco chase became an immediate centerpiece of American culture. The Bronco, described as the car of the century, became permanently etched into the cultural zeitgeist, even among later generations, and it became a permanent staple of 1990s America. Writing after Simpson's death in 2024, Los Angeles Times writer Richard Winton stated that the chase became a "where were you?" moment.

The widespread popular reaction and media coverage was unprecedented at the time. It helped make the ensuing trial more of a public spectacle. The amount of supporters Simpson had cheering him on as he and Cowlings drove throughout Los Angeles offered a preview into the divisions that would grip the country during his trial. A contemporary Los Angeles Times report in 1995 stated "Ninety-five million people watched that chase, not knowing how it would end. Suicide? Arrest? Escape? Violent confrontation? That shared adventure clearly gave many of them a vested interest, a sense of participation, of being on the inside of a national drama-cum-trauma in the making. And in this particular drama, virtually everyone felt he 'knew' the central player." The real-life nature of the spectacle unfolding before tens of millions of Americans on their TVs has been attributed in part to the rise of reality TV during the 1990s. Occurring during the rise of the internet and the beginning of the Computer Age, the event was retroactively described by many who experienced it as one of the last great monocultural moments in the United States.

The chase prompted changes in the media landscape. News outlets monitored the chase aerially from helicopters; the technology and technique for that had only recently developed, and the pursuit was one of the first instances where it was used on a mass scale. In particular, it helped precipitated a news genre of covering live police pursuits across the United States among both local and national television outlets. Unfolding during the rise of cable news, interruption of regular programming to focus on the event became more normalized afterwards, while the split screen effect used by outlets such as NBC during the chase became more standard. It and the resulting trial helped propagate the rise of true crime and tabloidesque legal analysis. The sensationalistic media coverage of the event was criticized by many. In addition to being chastised for interrupting regular programming, coverage of the chase was criticized for being excessively dangerous, given the degree of bystanders that meant journalists in cars had to avoid hitting, "voyeuristic", and for possibly encouraging similar acts. Tur's wife Marika later jokingly remarked that through popularizing helicopter coverage of high-speed pursuits, they had "ruined local news", adding that "you used to be watching entertainment shows and they'd break for news. After us, you watch the news and break for entertainment." Given the possibility of Simpson committing suicide live on air, news outlets were also criticized for allegedly treating the situation in a somewhat comical manner.

The white Bronco and chase would come to be widely referenced in popular culture. The September 1994 Seinfeld episode, "The Big Salad" directly referenced the chase, where Cosmo Kramer escorts an ex-baseball player named Steve Gendason in a low-speed police chase in a white Bronco. The 1996 WWF professional wrestling event WrestleMania XII in Anaheim referenced the chase as part of the "Hollywood Backlot Brawl" match between Goldust and Roddy Piper, which saw Piper chase Goldust's gold-painted Cadillac to Arrowhead Pond in a white Bronco. Coverage of the "chase" was depicted using actual archive footage from the O. J. Simpson chase, which was lampshaded by Vince McMahon commenting that the footage looked "awfully familiar".

Simpson himself referenced the Bronco in his 2006 pay-per-view show, Juiced with O.J. Simpson. In a specific skit, Simpson attempts to sell a similarly colored white Bronco at a Las Vegas used car lot. A bullet hole in this Bronco is circled with his autograph, and he pitches it to a prospective buyer by saying that if they "ever get into some trouble and have to get away, it has escapability." The American rock band Phish were holding a concert in Milwaukee, Wisconsin, on the night of the chase, and they repeatedly made references to it via lyrical alterations of the songs they performed. A staple of the 1990s, the name "White Ford Bronco" was used as the group name of a 1990s-style cover band based in Washington, D.C. The chase was also referenced in the 2004 film Shrek 2. In a scene from it, the character Gingerbread Man sits at home watching television, where a news anchor announces that "tonight on Knights, we got a white bronco heading east into the forest!" The "white bronco" was Donkey, who had been transformed into a literal white bronco and was being ridden by a human Shrek in a failed attempt to flee a group of knights. Following Simpson's death, the scene went viral on social media.

As a central part of Simpson's life, the chase and car have been referenced extensively in media about Simpson himself. The incident was covered in June 17th, 1994, a 2011 ESPN documentary as part of its 30 for 30 documentary series, and was recreated for FX's 2016 The People v. O. J. Simpson: American Crime Story, the first season in its American Crime Story series. The anniversaries of the chase in 2004, 2014 and 2024, as well as Simpson's death, were all marked by fresh reflection of the chase amongst the public and news media.
