= The Great Heisman Race of 1997 =

The Great Heisman Race of 1997 is a 2023 documentary by Gentry Kirby.

== Summary ==
A look back at the 1997 Heisman Trophy race (via archival footage) involving University of Tennessee quarterback Peyton Manning, University of Michigan cornerback Charles Woodson, Washington State University quarterback Ryan Leaf and Marshall University receiver Randy Moss.

== Aftermath ==
- Woodson (the eventual winner), Manning (the eventual runner-up), and Moss were each inducted into the Pro Football Hall of Fame.
- Manning would soon become the first overall draft pick that year to the Indianapolis Colts while the San Diego Chargers picked Leaf, the Oakland Raiders picked Woodson, and the Minnesota Vikings picked Moss.

== See also ==
- June 17th, 1994 - Another 30 for 30 episode similar in content
- Draft bust
- List of Heisman Trophy winners
