= National Museum of Crime and Punishment =

Privately owned museum dedicated to the history of criminology and penology in the U.S.

Coordinates: 38.897°N 77.0216°W

Crime Museum
- Equal Justice for All

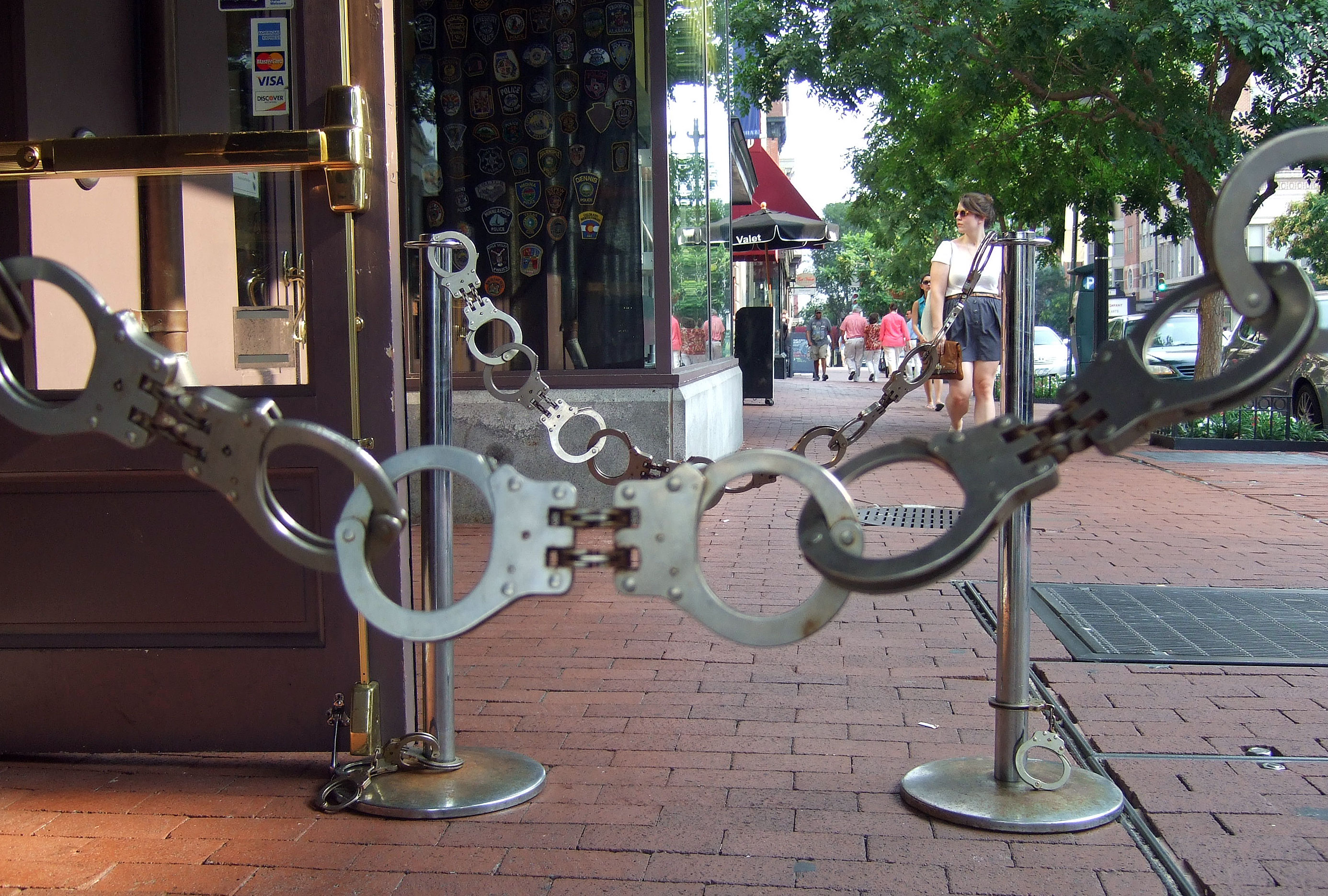
- Handcuffs at front entrance

- Location within Washington, D.C. National Museum of Crime and Punishment (the United States)
- Established: May 23, 2008
- Dissolved: September 30, 2015
- Location: 575 7th Street NW, Washington, D.C., USA
- Website: www.crimemuseum.org

The National Museum of Crime and Punishment, also known as the Crime Museum, was a privately owned museum dedicated to the history of criminology and penology in the United States. It was located in the Penn Quarter neighborhood of Washington, D.C., half a block south of the Gallery Place station. The museum closed in 2015 and is now operated as Alcatraz East, a museum in Pigeon Forge, Tennessee.

The museum was built by Orlando businessman John Morgan, in partnership with John Walsh, host of America's Most Wanted, at a cost of $21 million, and opened in May 2008. Unlike most museums in Washington, DC, the Crime Museum was a for-profit enterprise. It was forced to close in September 2015 by its building's owners after it failed to meet sales targets specified in its lease.

More than 700 artifacts in 28,000 square feet (2,600 m^{2}) of exhibition space related the history of crime, and its consequences, in America and American popular culture. The museum featured exhibits on colonial crime, pirates, Wild West outlaws, gangsters, the Mob, mass murderers, and white collar criminals. Twenty-eight interactive stations included the high-speed police chase simulators used in the training of law enforcement officers, and a Firearms Training Simulator (F.A.T.S.) similar to that utilized by the FBI.

== The galleries ==
The main floor was devoted to a staged crime scene investigation of a simulated murder. Visitors to the museum were guided through the process of solving the crime through forensic science techniques, including ballistics, blood analysis, fingerprinting and footprinting, and dental and facial reconstruction.

The museum included a mock police station with a booking room, celebrity mug shots, police line-up, lie detector test, prisoners' art, and jail-made weapons and escape tools, and a re-creation of the jail cell of Al Capone at the Eastern State Penitentiary in Philadelphia. A capital punishment room offered a re-creation of a guillotine and gas chamber, along with an authentic lethal injection machine from the state prison in Smyrna, Delaware, and an electric chair from the Tennessee State Prison in Nashville which was used for 125 executions.

The crime-fighting gallery drew attention to such notables as founding FBI Director J. Edgar Hoover, and the legendary law enforcement agent Eliot Ness. It also included the uniforms, firearms, and restraining equipment of law enforcement officers and exhibits on bomb squad and night vision technologies.

== America's Most Wanted studio ==
At one time, the museum also served as the taping facility for Fox's America's Most Wanted beginning in 2008, which recorded during its first run in studios throughout the Capital Region. When the series switched to on-location shooting, the studio was converted into an interactive exhibit where visitors could solve a hypothetical crime. Surrounding the studio were exhibits on the National Center for Missing and Exploited Children and McGruff the Crime Dog, as well as a Cross Match Technologies station for child fingerprinting.

== Highlighted attractions ==
- CSI Lab: Enter a crime scene and interact to solve the case in a real crime scene lab
- FBI Agent Training: Practice your aim in a simulated FBI shooting range
- High Speed Police Simulator: Drive in a police academy training pursuit
- Authentic Artifacts: Auxiliary, electric chair, gas chamber, prison art, and jail cells
- Notorious Criminals: Legendary pirates, the mob, Wild West outlaws, and serial killers
- Digital Fingerprinting for Children With Printout ID Cards
- America's Most Wanted Stage Set and John Walsh Interactive

== Gallery ==
Pirates Gallery

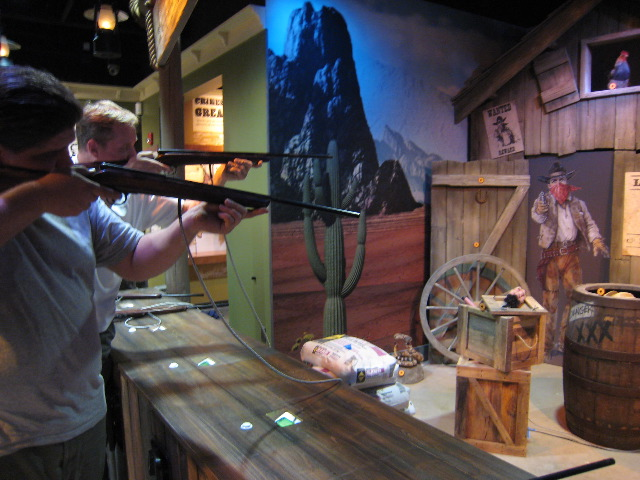
Wild West Shooting Gallery

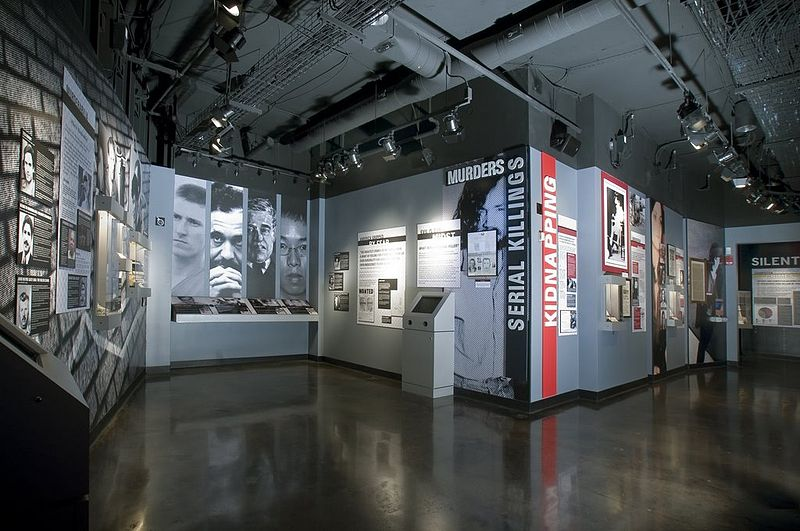
Serial Killers Gallery

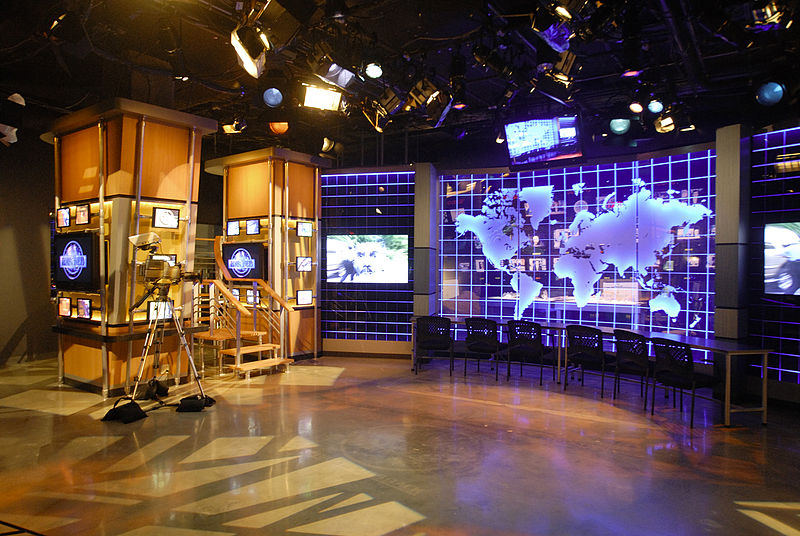
America's Most Wanted Television Studio

Crime and the Media Gallery

Mock crime scene

CSI footprints

CSI Reconstruction Techniques

The CSI Experience

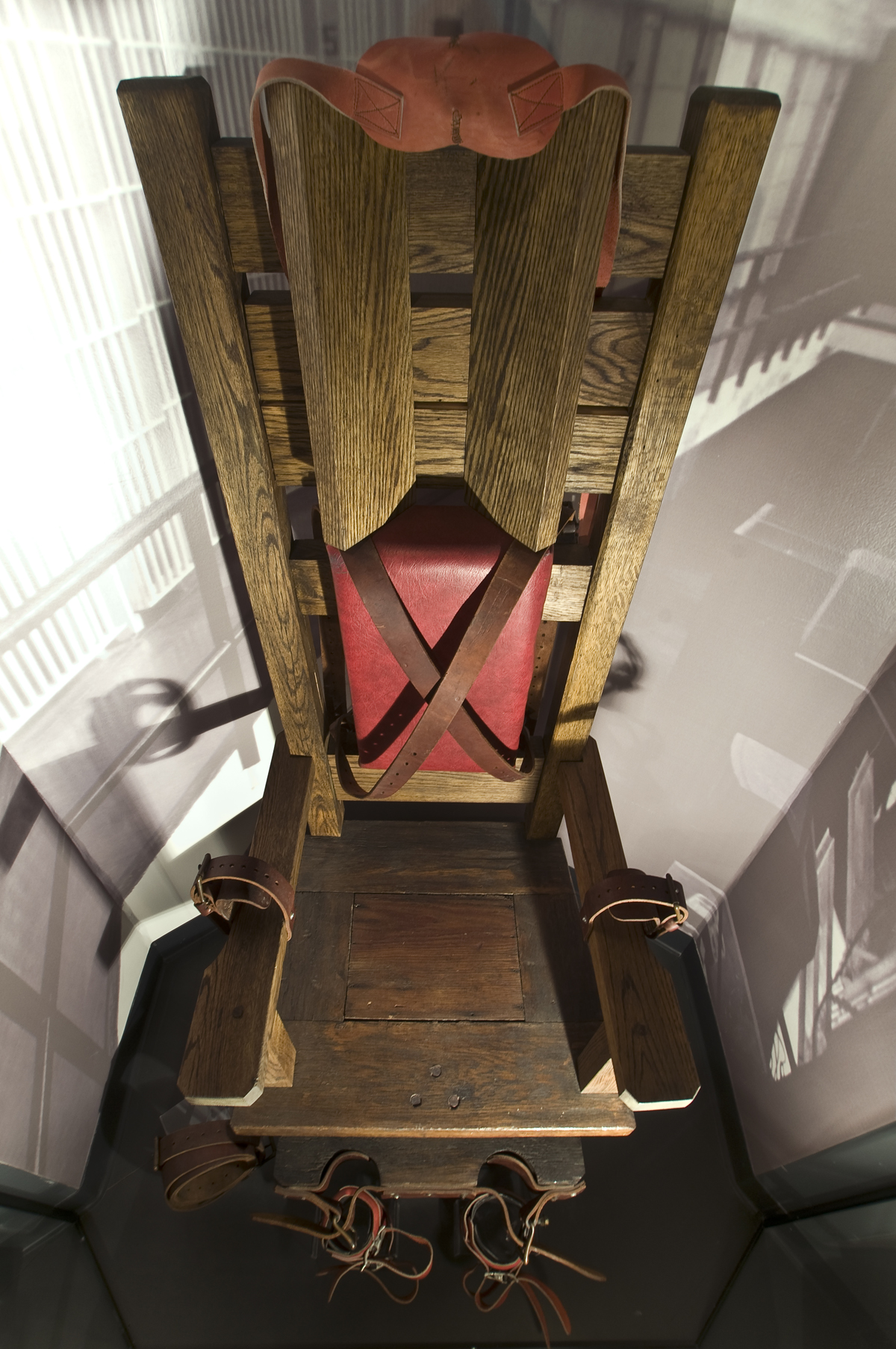
An electric chair

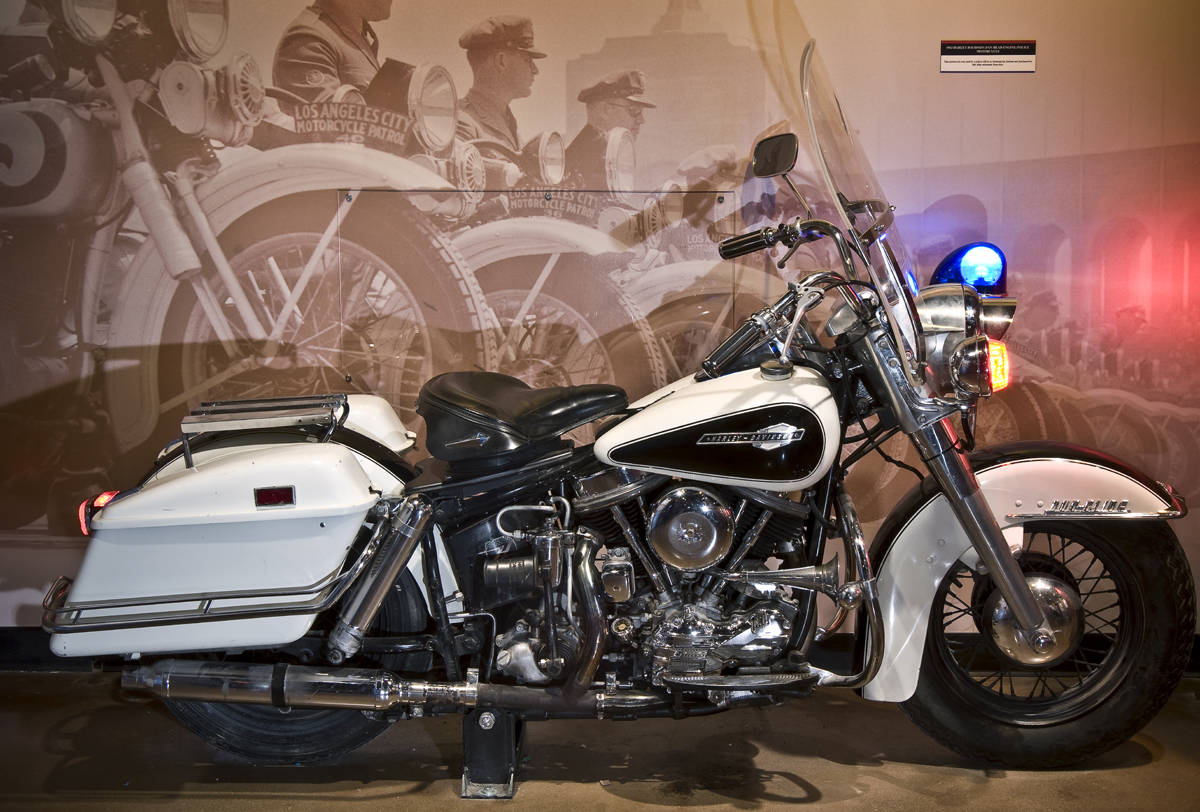
Harley Davidson police motorcycle

A jail cell

Staircase in the museum

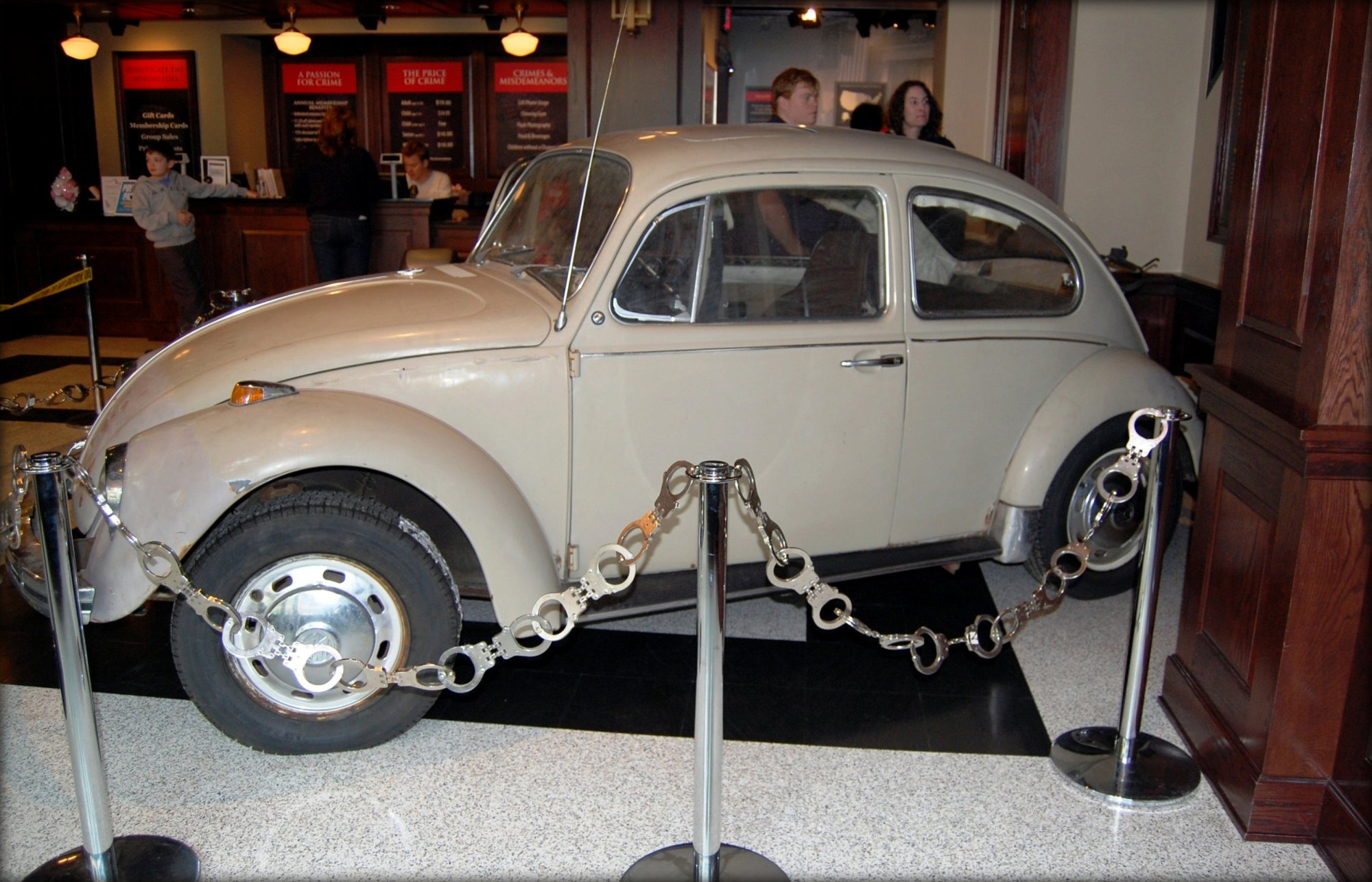
Serial killer Ted Bundy's 1968 Volkswagen Beetle

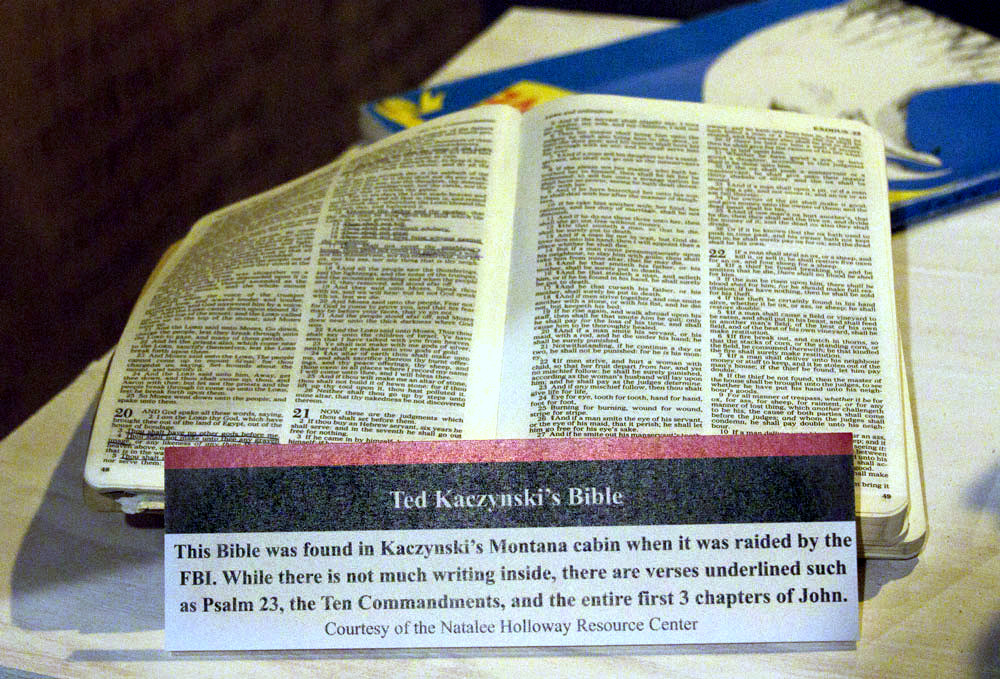
Ted Kaczynski's Bible
