= June 17th, 1994 =

2010 film by Brett Morgen

- Directed by: Brett Morgen
- Country of origin: United States
- Original language: English

Production
- Running time: 53 minutes

Original release
- Network: ESPN
- Release: June 16, 2010

June 17th, 1994 is a 2010 American documentary film by Brett Morgen that looks at various U.S. sporting events that happened on the day in question, the same date of O. J. Simpson's run from the police. The film jumps back and forth between the police chase and each sporting event using quick-cut archival footage without any narrator. The film was released on June 16, 2010, as part of ESPN's 30 for 30 series.

== Summary ==
The documentary details the events of Friday, June 17, 1994, in which several noteworthy sporting events occurred during the police chase of O. J. Simpson. Morgen says the diversity of the events provides an opportunity "to look at the soul of America".

The documentary features no narration and also no interviews and consists simply of clips from news sources throughout the day.

There are rare clips of sportscasters like Chris Berman and Bob Costas talking to their producers about how to deal with the O.J. story within the context of the events they were covering.

== Events occurring during this day ==
The events detailed in the documentary that occurred during the chase of Simpson are as follows.

- Arnold Palmer playing his final round at the 1994 U.S. Open (in a nod to the fact that this day had major events involving both Palmer and Simpson, a clip from a commercial that the two both-then-beloved athletes had filmed together in the 1970s for Hertz Global Holdings was shown during the film's end credits).
- The commencement of the 1994 FIFA World Cup, hosted for the first time by the United States with Oprah Winfrey and then-president Bill Clinton presenting.
- The New York Rangers celebrating their win in the 1994 Stanley Cup Final against the Vancouver Canucks with a ticker tape parade on Broadway, in the aftermath of the losing city having a riot three days earlier (the parade took place earlier in the day and was largely unaffected by the Simpson events).
- Game 5 of the 1994 NBA Finals between the Houston Rockets and the New York Knicks taking place at Madison Square Garden; most NBC affiliates split coverage between the game and the freeway chase (as narrated by NBC News anchor Tom Brokaw on a split-screen.)
- Seattle Mariners centerfielder Ken Griffey Jr. hitting a home run off of Kansas City Royals pitcher David Cone at Kauffman Stadium, tying Babe Ruth's record of the most home runs (30) before June 30 and the team's 65th game of the 1994 MLB season.

== Aftermath ==
- The U.S. Open concluded on Monday, June 20, with Ernie Els winning a three-way playoff for the championship. Arnold Palmer would continue on the Senior PGA Tour before retiring completely in 2006. He died on September 25, 2016.
- The World Cup concluded on Sunday, July 17 with Brazil winning its 4th championship after Italy player Roberto Baggio missed a must-make penalty during a shootout to decide the title. They would later win the 2002 FIFA World Cup. The U.S. is hosting the World Cup for the second time in 2026, in a joint effort with Canada and Mexico.
- The 1994 World Cup is also featured in another ESPN 30 for 30 documentary entitled The Two Escobars which follows Colombia men's national team player Andrés Escobar who scored an own goal for the United States on June 22. Escobar was murdered in Colombia on July 1, reputedly by cartel-connected hitmen, enraged that his error led to the team being eliminated from the World Cup tournament.
- The New York Rangers would not make another Stanley Cup Final until the first meeting between teams from New York City and Los Angeles for a major professional sports championship since the 1981 World Series (2014), when the team lost to the Kings four games to one, and they haven't won the Cup since 1994.
- The NBA Finals concluded June 22 with Houston winning the series in seven games. The Rockets would win another NBA Finals in 1995, but have not returned since. The Knicks would return to the NBA Finals in 1999 but lost that series 4–1 to the San Antonio Spurs; they did not return to the Finals until winning the 2026 NBA Finals against San Antonio again.
- The 1994 Major League Baseball season would end after the games of August 11 due to the player strike and with future Hall of Famer Ken Griffey Jr. hitting a total of 40 home runs. Major League Baseball didn't return until the 1995 regular season, and the long delay resulted in 18 games being cut from the schedule (though the 1995 World Series did take place on time).

Since the original 2010 release of the film:

- The documentary film O.J.: Made in America premiered at the Sundance Film Festival on January 22, 2016, then was later edited into a five-part miniseries than aired in June 2016 as part of ESPN's 30 for 30. The documentary explores race and celebrity through the life of Simpson. It then won the Academy Award for Best Documentary Feature at the 89th Academy Awards in 2017, 23 years after the chase.
- Simpson died of cancer at age 76 on April 11, 2024, about 30 years after the infamous chase.

== Critical reception ==
Robert Lloyd wrote in The Los Angeles Times: "Morgen juxtaposes the events of that day in a kind of associative round robin, finding points of contrast and commonality, of similar action and visual consonance, on which to turn his film. But he offers no other, more remote perspective; this is not a summing up of events, but rather a meditation, of an elemental sort, not just on sports but on the way of the world."

Rolling Stone writer Noel Murray ranks June 17th, 1994 as the best documentary in the 30 for 30 series as he saw the montage style of the film as a reflection on "how viewers process television", and argues that it comments on "how the media struggles to make sense of events that have no clear outcome."

Jimmy Traina of Sports Illustrated called it a "tremendously fun watch".

== See also ==
- Ken Burns' Baseball
- Social effects of television
- Media culture
