= Alcatraz East =

Crime museum in Pigeon Forge, Tennessee, US

Alcatraz East Crime Museum

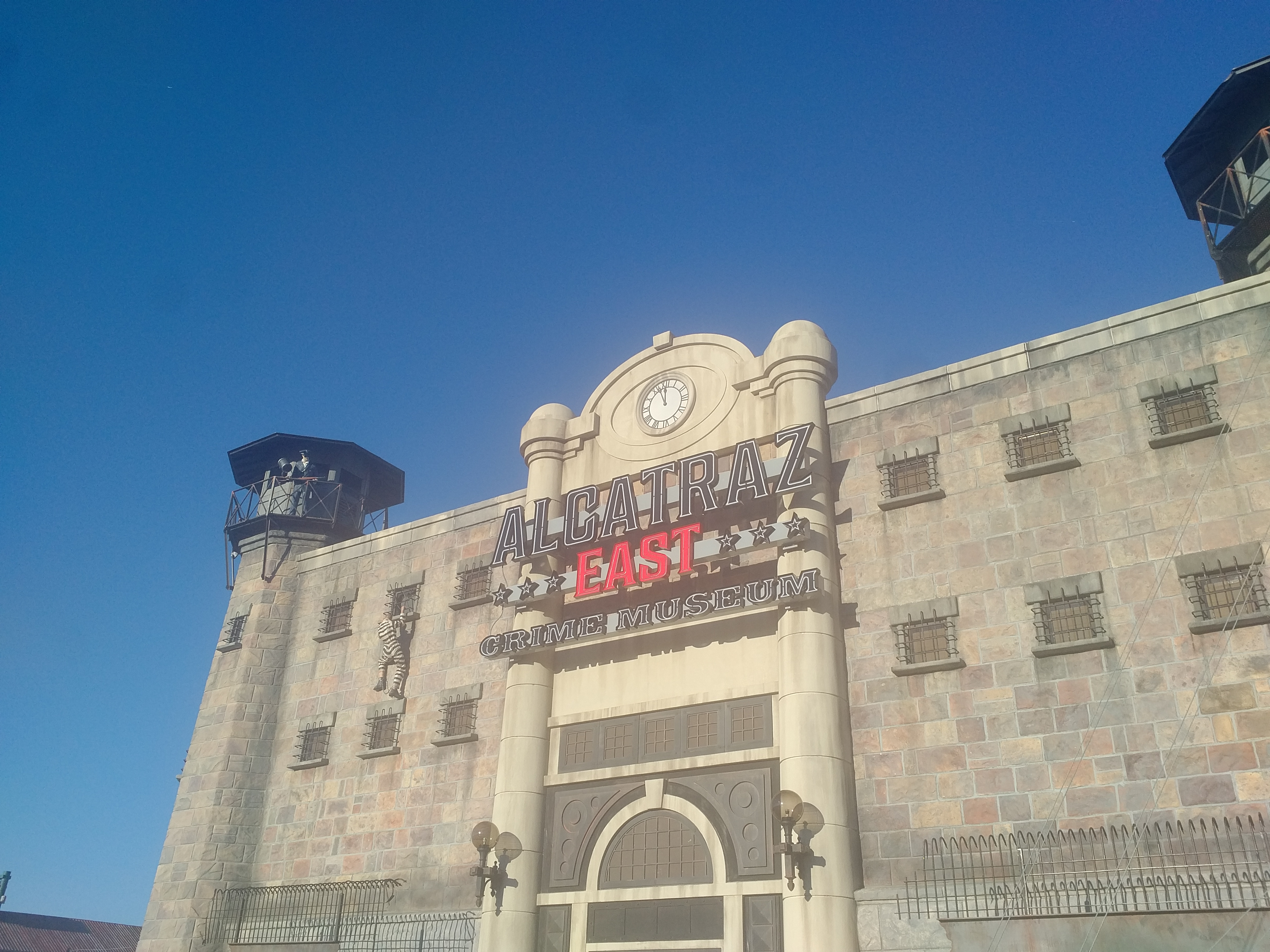
- Building modeled to look like a 19th-century prison
- Former name: National Museum of Crime and Punishment
- Established: 2008, 2016
- Location: 2757 Parkway; Pigeon Forge, Tennessee 37863
- Coordinates: 35.8016°N 83.5715°W
- Website: www.alcatrazeast.com

Alcatraz East is a privately owned for-profit crime museum in Pigeon Forge, Tennessee. Opened in 2008 as the National Museum of Crime and Punishment in Washington, D.C., the museum moved in 2016 to its present site in Pigeon Forge. The museum gives a behind-the-scenes look at crime history in America. It was created and built by attorney John Morgan and chief operating officer Janine Vaccarello.

Alcatraz East is 24,000 square feet, two stories, and is themed as a 19th-century prison inspired by the infamous Alcatraz island prison in San Francisco. Alcatraz East includes interactive displays and artifacts that cover criminal intent, criminal profiles, the penal system, victims' stories, law enforcement, crime prevention, forensic science, and the U.S. justice system.

The historical area of the museum displays how crimes were committed, cases were solved, and how jury members came to an agreement on final sentencing. Anecdotes and facts about the background and behaviors of infamous prisoners are also a part of the museum.

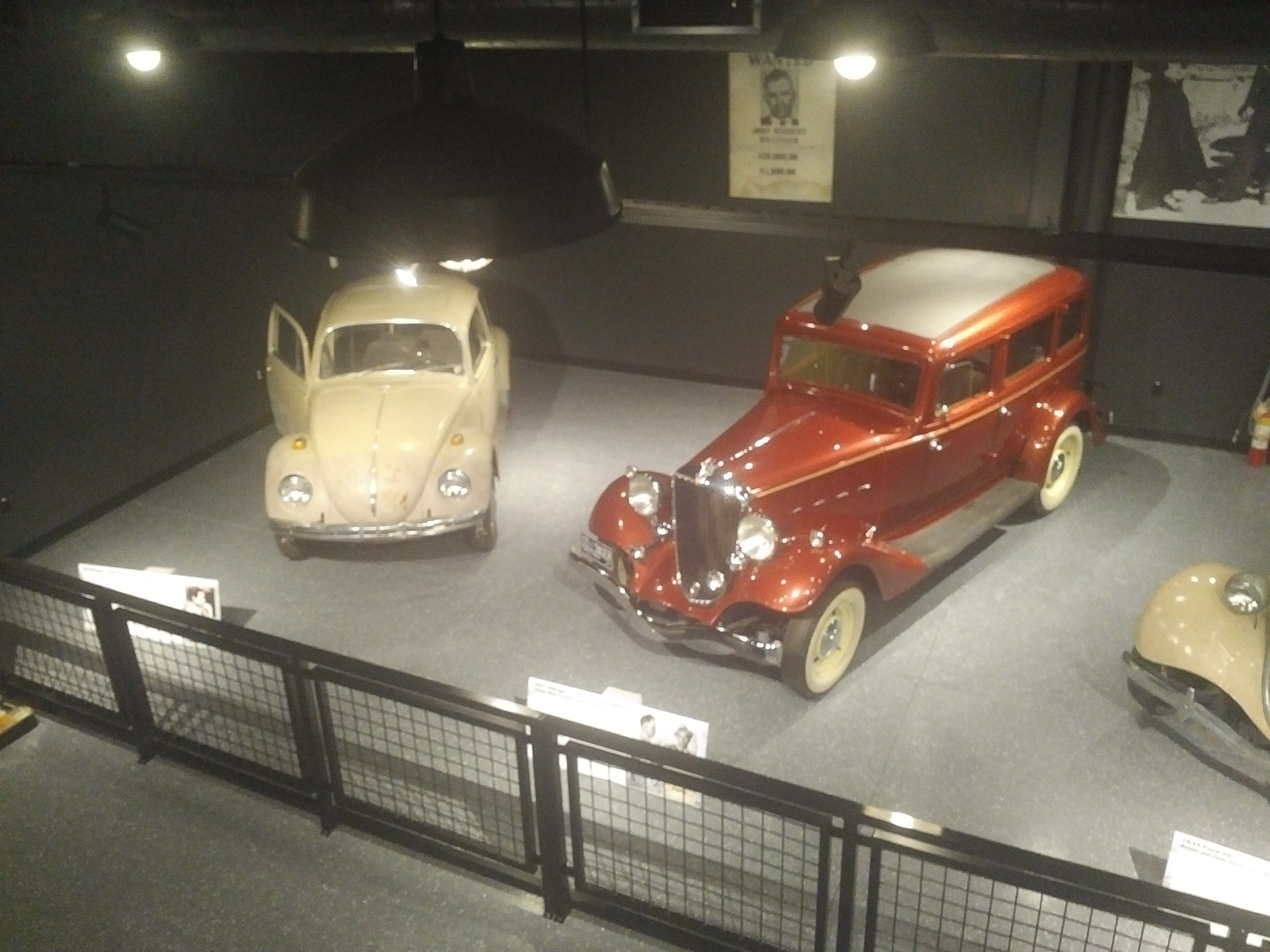
Left: Ted Bundy's Volkswagen Beetle Right: John Dillinger's 1933 Essex Terraplane, both on display at Alcatraz East

There are 20 different exhibit areas to explore that cover five themes; the history of American crime, the consequences of crime, crime scene investigation, crime fighting, and pop culture. Authentic pieces used as evidence in well-known criminal cases, and interactive exhibits and activities, are on display. A CSI lab, safe-cracking, a simulated shooting range, DUI interactive safety training, and digital fingerprinting are some of the activities visitors can participate in.

Artifacts on display include John Dillinger's Essex-Terraplane, Al Capone's rosary, Ted Bundy's Volkswagen Beetle and the Ford Bronco from the O. J. Simpson murder case, an FBI polygraph machine, Al Pacino's sub-machine gun from the movie Scarface, items related to the 2012 Benghazi attack, and the latest in law enforcement technology.
