= Zoey Tur =

American broadcast reporter (born 1960)

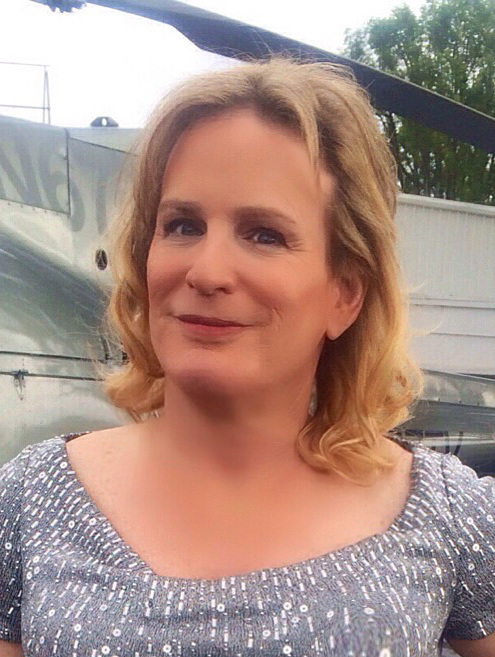
- Born: Robert Albert Tur; June 8, 1960 (age 66); Los Angeles County, California, U.S.
- Occupations: Reporter, journalist
- Spouse: Marika Gerrard (m. 1980; div. 2003)
- Children: 2, including Katy Tur

Hanna Zoey Tur (born Robert Albert Tur, June 8, 1960) is an American broadcast reporter and commercial pilot who operated the freelance news company Los Angeles News Service with fellow reporter and then-wife Marika Gerrard.

== Early life and education ==
Born to a Jewish family, Tur dropped out of college at age 18 in 1978.

== Career ==
Tur's company Los Angeles News Service (LANS) was the first to use an AStar helicopter in a major city to cover breaking news, and the first to televise a high-speed police chase. In 1989, Tur used a helicopter to locate a camper in need of a kidney transplant. This incident was reenacted on the television program Rescue 911.

Tur and Gerrard captured video of the attack on Reginald Denny during the 1992 Los Angeles riots. She successfully sued another news agency for copyright infringement for using their footage of the 1992 L.A. riots without authorization, and later attempted to sue YouTube for hosting the same video on its site.

Tur was the first to broadcast O. J. Simpson's low-speed chase on June 17, 1994. As a team, Tur and Gerrard received three Television News Emmy Awards and Edward R. Murrow Awards for broadcast excellence, an Associated Press National Breaking News award; and The National Press Photographers Association (NPPA) Humanitarian Award.

In 1991, the Federal Aviation Administration (FAA) revoked Tur's pilot's license for "reckless flying" after a complaint from the Los Angeles City Fire Department. In 1994, a California Superior Court ruled against the LAFD for suborning perjury in the original FAA action, awarding $550,000 and ruling that "public employees are not immune from liability for malicious prosecution if they instigate the prosecution through fraudulent, corrupt or malicious misrepresentations".

Tur has been credited with locating seven missing aircraft.

In 2007, Tur hosted a documentary series on MSNBC called Why They Run. The show reported on why criminal suspects ran from police, and included interviews with those involved in police pursuits.

In 2015, Tur appeared in three episodes of Inside Edition on CNN, on TMZ, and on Dr. Drew On Call. In 2016, Tur appeared in several episodes of the miniseries O.J.: Made in America. The series features archival footage as well as Tur's recollections of covering the 1992 Los Angeles riots in episode 2 and of the June 17, 1994 police chase of O. J. Simpson.

== Personal life ==
Tur's 23-year marriage to Marika Gerrard came to an end in 2003. The couple had two children: Katy, now a television news reporter and anchor, and James, who is a physician.

In June 2013, Tur publicly came out as transgender, and in 2014 revealed that she was undergoing hormone replacement therapy. In August 2014, following gender reassignment surgery, she applied to a court to change her name and gender marker from male to female. Reflecting on her transition in a 2017 interview, Tur stated, "What I have is not political. It's a medical condition that was treated. I'm cured. I'm done. It's not a mental illness. There are differences in the brain."

In 2017, Tur said in an interview that her daughter Katy had become estranged from her because of the transition. Katy said in response that they "were not on speaking terms for a little while" but that it was not because of the transition.

Tur is a principal subject of daughter Katy's 2022 memoir Rough Draft. It depicts life for the younger Katy in her childhood that saw the highs of adventure with her parents but also lows that related to the violence that made for a shaky childhood upbringing, which she equated to "living on the edge of a knife," specifically because of her father. Her father's 2013 transition was part of the estrangement, with Katy stating, "My dad, in going through the transition wanted to bury Bob Tur ... [to] have that personality be erased. But Bob Tur was so much a part of my life that I felt if we wanted to move on and become something new, we’d have to confront it."

=== Views on transgender rights ===
During a TMZ video chat in the summer of 2013, Tur described in piloting terms her understanding of one practical impact of the changes in her brain over the course of her hormone replacement therapy. Tur stated, "...you start thinking with white matter as opposed to men thinking with gray matter, so, where I was able to make split decisions flying and being in really rough conditions, weather conditions, I don't know if I'd be as good a pilot, because now I'm using white matter, and I'm becoming, really... That bridges the left and right brains, and you become [a] consensus builder, you start becoming more analytical, not as impulsive as you are when you're a guy." In their editorial comments, TMZ interpreted her words as meaning that she "doesn't believe women can make the same quick, decisive decisions like men when piloting an aircraft."

In July 2015, while on Dr. Drew On Call and talking about Caitlyn Jenner's acceptance of the Arthur Ashe Courage Award at the ESPY Awards ceremony, political commentator Ben Shapiro questioned her genetics and called Tur "sir". Tur responded by gripping the back of Shapiro's neck and telling him to stop or he would "be going home in an ambulance." Following the incident, Shapiro filed a police complaint against Tur alleging battery, stating that he intended to also press charges. He said he did so to teach the left a lesson. Tur responded by stating that the complaint was Shapiro's attempt to keep the story in the news and claiming that "Orthodox Jews are flirting with white nationalists." Soon after the complaint's filing, the Los Angeles Police Department dropped it; Shapiro did not press charges.
