= Reaction to the verdict in the O. J. Simpson criminal trial =

Responses to the 1995 acquittal

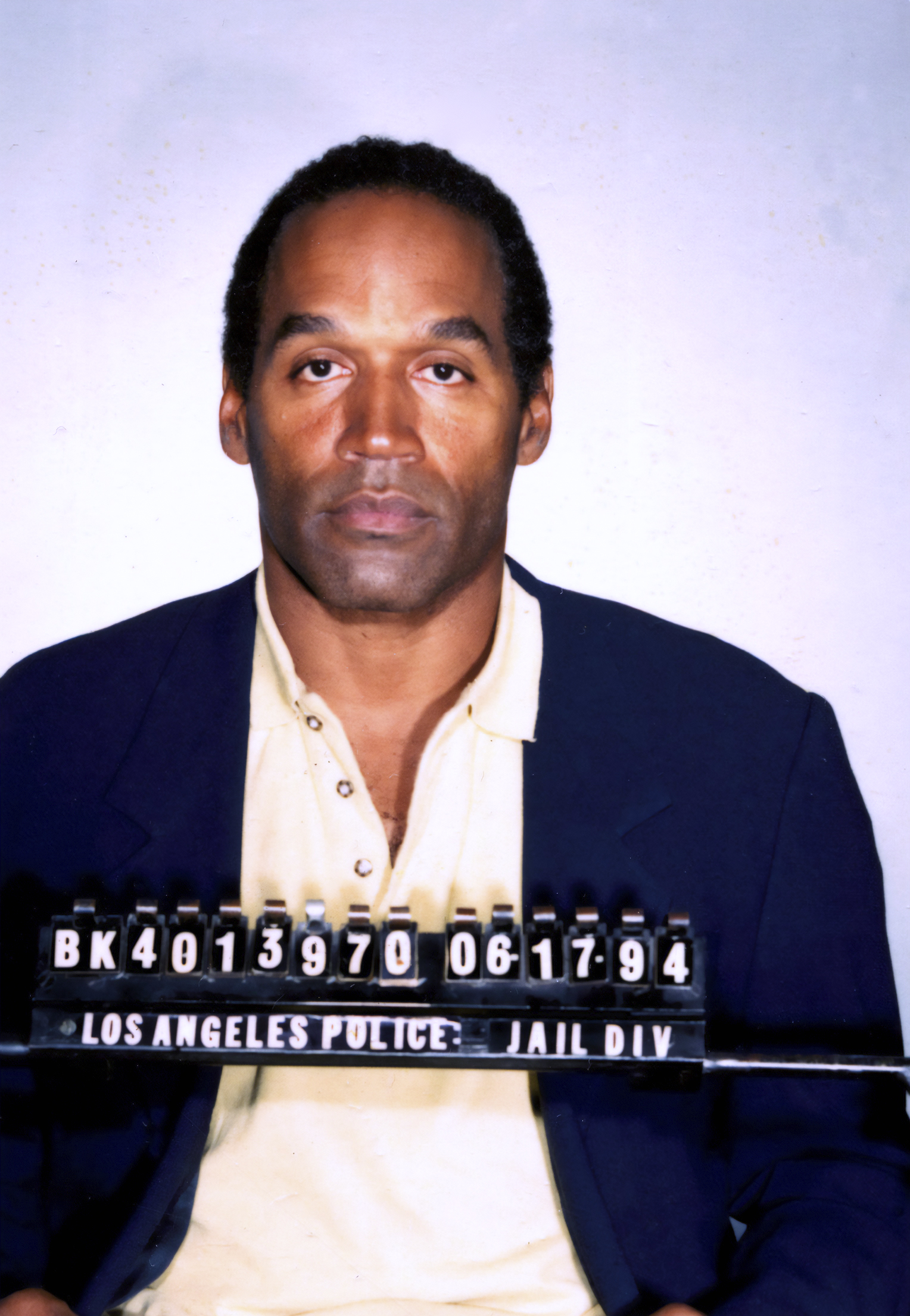
Simpson's mugshot, June 17, 1994

On Tuesday, October 3, 1995, the verdict in the murder trial of O. J. Simpson was announced and Simpson was acquitted on both counts of murder. Although the nation observed the same evidence presented at trial, a division along racial lines emerged in observers' opinion of the verdict, which the media dubbed the "racial gap". Immediately following the trial, polling showed that most African Americans believed Simpson was innocent and justice had been served, while most White Americans felt he was guilty and the verdict was a racially motivated jury nullification by a mostly African-American jury. Current polling shows the gap has narrowed since the trial, with the majority of black respondents in 2016 stating they believed Simpson was guilty.

The narrowing racial gap is primarily attributed to several factors: Daniel Petrocelli disproving all of the blood planting claims at the wrongful death civil trial, defense witness Henry Lee publishing a peer review study in 1996 that effectively refuted the contamination claim that disputed the validity of the state's DNA evidence, and the fading of Simpson's celebrity status since the trial.

Simpson's celebrity status faded among African Americans after he relocated to Florida and disappeared from the public eye. His arrest and conviction in 2008 for armed robbery brought him back into the public spotlight, especially after he received a disproportionately higher prison sentence than his co-conspirators, which generated controversy even from his detractors, but the response from African Americans was relatively muted, and pundits opined this demonstrated how much the conscience of Black America has evolved since the time the verdict was announced.

The trial and verdict had an historic impact on American culture, credited with transforming public opinion about domestic abuse from being considered a private familial matter to a serious crime as well as raising awareness about the stigma that interracial couples still face from both white and African Americans. The enduring blowback also likely contributed to the passing of California Proposition 209 in 1996 that ended affirmative action in the state, due to the decline in empathy towards issues of racial discrimination and civil rights among White Americans.

== Criticism of the jury ==
Jurors Armanda Cooley, Carrie Bess and Marsha Rubin-Jackson published Madam Foreman: A Rush to Judgement? in January 1996. They describe why they felt there was reasonable doubt despite personally believing Simpson might be guilty. Because it was published only a few months after the verdict and before the other attorneys and detectives published their books, it is considered an accurate picture of what the jury believed when they acquitted Simpson. Critics panned the book, and it became a source of embarrassment for the authors as critics claim it proves many of their claims about the jury.

=== Misunderstanding of DNA evidence ===
Jeffrey Toobin, M. L. Rantala, and Vincent Bugliosi all claim the jurors misunderstood the DNA evidence in the case. Rantala based this on the claims they made in Madam Foreman. Bess wrote she thought the blood at the crime scene belonged to Simpson's children while Cooley wrote she thought the blood actually belonged to criminalist Andrea Mazzola. In Outrage, Bugliosi opined they misunderstood the defense's argument because "contamination cannot change someone's DNA into someone else's" which is what the jurors apparently believed. Toobin wrote they misunderstood the facts of the case regarding the DNA evidence. Jackson wrote she thought Simpson's blood at the crime scene was there before the murders happened. Bess also admitted to not knowing that Simpson's blood was on the glove found at his home that Fuhrman allegedly planted. Cooley admitted to discarding blood evidence without any justification at all. Juror Beatrice Wilson admitted that "I didn't understand the DNA stuff at all. To me, it was a waste of time. It was way out there and carried absolutely no weight with me."

The jurors stopped claiming there was reasonable doubt about the DNA evidence after learning that both of the forensic DNA experts for the defense, Henry Lee and Edward Blake, had rejected the contamination claim that Scheck and Neufeld argued. Blake also admitted that was the reason why he was dropped from the witness list. Cochran mentioned Blake in opening statements but never produced him as a witness, and in closing arguments, Clark had mentioned Blake's absence as proof the results were reliable.

=== Dismissal of domestic violence being racially motivated ===
Clark wrote that she believed the jury dismissed Simpson's abuse of Nicole for racial reasons. She wrote that "race trumped gender" and that they identified with the abuser rather than the victim due to race. Shapiro, Dershowitz, and Uelman also agreed with Clark. Dershowitz stated: "[the jurors] were black first, women second". Uelman stated their research suggested that black women typically are opposed to interracial marriage and would be hostile to Brown. Detective Mark Fuhrman was also accused of opposing interracial couples, but he was labeled a racist for this and many other reasons, while the African-American jurors who felt the same way were not.

The jurors called the domestic violence argument a "waste of time," and juror Brenda Moran said "this is a murder trial, not a domestic violence trial". They claim they discarded it because there were no new incidents of abuse by Simpson against Brown since January 1989 but an audio recording of a 911 call made by Brown of an incident with Simpson eight months before her death was presented at trial and again during summation. The jurors also claimed that they did not believe Brown thought her life was seriously in danger, but one of the documents they saw at trial was a will stating her wishes in the event of her death. In 2016, Carrie Bess's statement regarding Nicole continuing her marriage to Simpson despite the abuse was consistent with victim blaming: "I lose respect for any woman who takes an ass-whoopin' when she don't have to. Don't stay under the water if it's over your head, you'll drown". Writing for Bustle, Caitlin Gallagher criticized Bess and labelled her comment as "unsettling" and "wholly intolerable".

Bill Hodgman concluded that the black jurors were not able to connect the domestic abuse with the murder, while Clark claimed that they understood it fully but simply did not care about Nicole Brown. In O.J.: Made in America, African-American journalist Sylvester Monroe addressed the racial issues involved in the trial and claimed that his mother had said that had Simpson been accused of beating and murdering his first wife, Marguerite L. Whitley, who was African-American, "this would not have been the trial of the century, and his black ass would be in jail".

Shapiro wrote that the jury consultants stated that "black women often will be defensive and even protective of black men who are accused of such behavior by white women." Dismissed juror Jeanette Harris was cited as an example of this. She concealed her own domestic abuse by her former husband so she could be on the jury, but then denied it so she could stay on the jury and then minimized it after being dismissed in order to protect Simpson, even after his domestic abuse against Brown had been proven.

Darnel Hunt opines that the worst part of the prosecution's case was the indifference by contemporary African Americans to the domestic violence. The revelation of the abuse against Brown had turned public opinion against Simpson, but his support among African Americans remained relatively unchanged. The tension over interracial marriage in the United States stems from it once being criminalized. These laws were created by the white majority and were indisputably motivated by racism. All of the jurors were raised at a time when those laws were still in place in some parts of the country before finally being ruled unconstitutional in Loving v. Virginia in 1967. The son of the first interracial couple married in Virginia after that ruling was Ezra Edelman, the director of O.J.: Made in America.

The jurors stopped claiming the abuse was irrelevant after Lenore E. Walker revealed that she was dropped from the witness list by the defense because her research concluded that over 80% of murdered spouses who are victims of abuse are killed by their abusers. Rubin-Jackson later apologized to Denise Brown, who became an advocate for survivors of domestic violence, for calling it a waste of time.

The strong public reaction to Brown's letters and statements that were later ruled inadmissible as hearsay spurred passage of the Violence Against Women Act in 1994, which Clark and Douglas referred to as the "O.J. rule". The act was a direct response to the Simpson case and included provisions that required mandatory arrests in domestic violence situations, allowed prosecution of abusers even if the victim doesn't testify, and provided hearsay exceptions in domestic violence situations so statements made by the victim are admissible even if they are unavailable for cross-examination. After the trial, researchers reported increased reporting, arrests, and harsher sentences for those convicted of domestic violence.

=== Bias against the prosecution ===
Bugliosi wrote that "there can be little question - though no one could expect any of the Simpson jurors to admit it - that most members of the jury were biased against the prosecution and in favor of Simpson", and that "Other than when a killer is apprehended in the act, I have never seen a more obvious case of guilt. All of the evidence - not some or most of it - points irresistibly to Simpson's guilt and his guilt alone" and claims the jury was biased against the prosecution and the police and made absurd arguments for discarding evidence and specifically cites the bloody footprint in Simpson's Bronco as proof of this. Police found a trail of bloody footprints in Brown's blood made by the killer leading from the crime scene to the alleyway where cars are usually parked and a faint one inside Simpson's Bronco. Bugliosi said they could have convicted Simpson based solely on that but they discarded it and claimed absurdly that Fuhrman could have planted it there.

Alan Dershowitz stated the jury "wanted to let Simpson go" and cited their dismissal of Allan Park's testimony for "trivial" reasons as evidence of this. Park testified that Simpson's Bronco was not there when he arrived that night at Rockingham and no one answered the intercom for several minutes or appeared to be home. Park then presumably saw Simpson arrive that night at his house, but Bess said she dismissed Park's testimony because he also admitted that didn't know how many cars were parked in Simpson's driveway at that time, which had nothing to do with his testimony. Bess also said she discarded the evidence of Simpson's blood at the crime scene because she believed Vannatter could have planted it there when he returned to Simpson's home that evening even though the crime scene wasn't even there. Shelia Woods discarded all of the DNA evidence at the crime because she incorrectly thought all of it was found on the back gate, and she found that suspicious. Cooley admitted to discarding the blood evidence without any justification at all.

In Ezra Edelman's 2016 documentary O.J.: Made in America, Carrie Bess said she believed "90% of the jury" actually decided to acquit Simpson as payback for the 1991 Rodney King incident, not because they believed in his innocence, and when asked if she believed the decision was correct, she merely shrugged indifferently. Following the acquittal, Bill Hodgman claimed that in conversation with the deputy sheriff who had released the jurors, the sheriff had witnessed reunions and celebrations between the jurors and their families and heard numerous times that the acquittal was indeed revenge for Rodney King.

Juror Yolanda Crawford, however, denied Bess's claim, and said that the verdict was due to the prosecution's mistakes, such as presenting Fuhrman as a witness and having Simpson don the gloves, while also voicing her displeasure at what she perceived as Cochran's attempts to sway the jury with racial hints such as wearing an African-style tie. In an interview with Meredith Vieira, she said the verdict may have been different had they seen the photos of Simpson wearing the Bruno Magli shoes that he denied owning. However, the sole black juror in the civil case that was dismissed stated afterwards that she would have hung the jury had she stayed because she thought all 31 photos of Simpson wearing those shoes were forgeries.

“On the evidence that they gave me to evaluate, it was crooked by the cops," juror David Aldana said in an interview. “The evidence given to me to look at, I could not convict. Did he do it? Maybe, maybe not." Juror Sheila Woods denied the jury’s decision was based on race in an interview with Vulture. When asked if she believed Simpson was framed, Woods stated, “I don’t know if he was necessarily framed. I think O.J. may know something about what happened, but I just don’t think he did it. I think it was more than one person, just because of the way she was killed. I don’t know how he could have just left that bloody scene — because it was bloody — and got back into his Bronco and not have it filled with blood. And then go back home and go in the front door, up the stairs to his bedroom … That carpet was snow white in his house. He should have blood all over him or bruises because Ron Goldman was definitely fighting for his life. He had defensive cuts on his shoes and on his hands. O.J. only had that little cut on his finger. If Goldman was kicking to death, you would think that the killer would have gotten some bruises on his body. They showed us photos of O.J. with just his underwear just two days after, and he had no bruises or anything on his body.” In an interview with CNN following Simpson’s death, juror Yolanda Adams said she was still comfortable with her decision to render a not guilty verdict and denied the verdict was based on payback for Rodney King, citing the reasonable doubt in the case presented by the defense and the actions of the police officers involved in the case like Mark Fuhrman pleading the fifth when he was asked if he planted or manufactured any evidence against Simpson.

All of the jurors expressed a belief that fraud had taken place, but during the subsequent civil trial, Daniel M. Petrocelli had deductively disproven all of the blood planting conspiracy claims made at the criminal trial by Scheck. Petrocelli noted that the evidence used to disprove those claims was available at the criminal trial which led to further criticism that the jury discarded evidence and that the verdict was a racially motivated jury nullification. The only fraud claim that could not be deductively disproven was Fuhrman planting the glove at Simpson's home, but there was no physical or eyewitness evidence to support this. Jeffrey Toobin wrote that the defense was planning on making that claim months before the trial began because that was the only explanation for why that glove was found at Simpson's home. The only two arguments made to support that claim were Simpson's struggling to put on the gloves and the Fuhrman tapes which suggested he was capable of such conduct. The investigation into the Fuhrman tapes found no evidence of wrongdoing and instead found evidence that he was playacting for the Hollywood screenwriter like he later claimed, and Shapiro admitted that Simpson was acting (as the prosecution claimed) when he appeared to struggle to put on the gloves.

Vincent Bugliosi wrote that the conspiracy allegations were designed to explain incriminating evidence that the defense couldn't refute. Simpson's blood on the Bundy back gate, Brown's blood on the sock, the bloody footprint in Simpson's Bronco and the location of one of the bloody gloves (Simpson's home) couldn't be explained by either contamination or incompetence so the defense made conspiracy claims of fraud instead. When the prosecution began offering evidence refuting the contamination claim and demonstrating the irrelevance of the mistakes made, the conspiracy allegation expanded to claim that all of the evidence was planted.

Darnel Hunt wrote that African American distrust of the police is not unfounded, but the claim of a wide-ranging police conspiracy was entirely implausible. Hunt said the jury accepted and believed every fraud claim the defense made without question, and that is what later led to their criticism after those claims were refuted. Years later, some of the jurors still reiterate those claims. In a 2016 interview, juror Shelia Woods stated she still thinks that traces of Simpson's blood found on the back gate at the Bundy crime scene was planted by the police despite the blood being photographed there prior to Simpson's blood being drawn from his arm.

Prosecutor William Hodgman was supposed to be Clark's co-counsel but was replaced with Darden after he became hospitalized. During a press conference, Johnnie Cochran claimed that the prosecution were merely using Darden as a black man to boost their case, which caused the jury to consider Darden a token black assigned to the case. Mark Fuhrman wrote feeling the same way about Darden. Jeffrey Toobin claimed that everything Cochran was saying about Darden was basically "Uncle Tom" and expressed his disgust at Cochran's behavior.

=== Reversal of opinion by some jurors and defense attorneys ===
Several jurors have reversed their previous opinions of Simpson's innocence. In 2016, Carrie Bess admitted that while she still believes that acquitting Simpson as payback for Rodney King was the correct decision in the atmosphere of the 1990s, she regrets the not guilty verdict following Simpson's arrest in Las Vegas, and labelled Simpson as "stupid" for getting himself into more trouble. Juror number nine, Lionel Cryer, a former member of the Black Panther Party who notably gave Simpson a black power raised fist after the verdict, said that in retrospect, he would render a guilty verdict. Juror Anise Aschenbach, who initially voted guilty before changing her vote, stated she regrets the decision and believes Simpson is guilty because he is not looking for the "real killer" like he promised he would. As of 2023, Carrie Bess remains the only author of Madame Foreman who has not apologized to either the Browns or Goldmans for the verdict, the book or her comments about Nicole, and who continues to assert that acquitting Simpson as payback for Rodney King was not an incorrect decision.

In Outrage, Bugliosi pointed out that after the not guilty verdict was read, while Johnnie Cochran was the only lawyer who appeared happy to the point that he shouted a triumphant "yes!" heard in the courtroom and immediately afterword he hugged Simpson from behind, Shapiro and Kardashian both looked rather shocked and distraught, while Bailey looked indifferent. The latter three which Bugliosi cited was uncommon for defense attorneys to display no emotion who had successfully acquitted a client they truly believed to be innocent.

In O.J.: Made in America, film director Peter Hyams, who had worked with Simpson in Capricorn One, claimed that he had discussed the possibility of Simpson's guilt with a friend, who had admitted that in order for Mark Fuhrman to successfully frame Simpson, he would have to know that Simpson had no alibi whatsoever and that he was not risking his own job or life as well, since Fuhrman would have been facing the death penalty himself if he had attempted to manufacture or plant evidence in a double homicide case which itself warranted capital punishment (as this preceded Gil Garcetti's decision to reduce Simpson's maximum possible sentence from execution to life without parole), and went on to admit that he believed Simpson was the killer. Scheck refused to give a definitive answer as to whether or not he truly believed all the evidence against Simpson had been planted as he had claimed at the trial, claiming that it was not his place to believe and that he is not omniscient. Bailey, who had since been disbarred for attorney misconduct and was the only one allowed to express his personal opinion, continued to assert without any valid explanation or proof that Fuhrman single-handedly planted the glove to frame Simpson, and when asked what motive Fuhrman would have, Bailey merely responded that Simpson had married a white woman, which he described as a "capital offense in Fuhrman's eyes". In an interview with Barbara Walters, Robert Kardashian admitted that he had doubts about Simpson's innocence due to the blood evidence. Kardashian, who was close friends with Nicole, would later sever his ties with Simpson.

== Criticism of the prosecution ==
Prosecutor Hank Goldberg published The Prosecution Responds: An O.J. Simpson Trial Prosecutor Reveals what Really Happened (1999) and wrote that the verdict was the result of a "perfect storm" of mistakes by investigators, prosecutors, and the court, all taking place in the aftermath of the 1992 Los Angeles riots. Former Los Angeles County Deputy District Attorney Vincent Bugliosi published Outrage: The Five Reasons Why O. J. Simpson Got Away with Murder. Bugliosi primarily attributes the verdict to poor decisions by the prosecutors but added that poor stewardship by Judge Lance Ito and the change of venue that he claims resulted in a jury that was hostile to the prosecution contributed as well.

=== Inaccurate estimate of Simpson's blood draw ===
According to Goldberg, Hodgman, Darden and Marcia Clark, the principal mistake made in the case was during the preliminary phase when Thano Peratis incorrectly estimated how much blood he drew from Simpson. He estimated initially that he withdrew 8 mLs from Simpson, but the records show that only 6.5 mLs was accounted for, and the defense alleged that 1.5 mLs of Simpson's blood was missing. That mistake threw the prosecution on the defensive as Scheck claimed it was missing due to fraud. Peratis was scheduled to testify again early in the trial to clarify, but he became hospitalized, and the jury never heard him correct his estimate until the rebuttal stage of the trial, after Scheck had already made all of his blood planting claims.

=== The glove demonstration ===
It was prosecutor Christopher Darden who asked to have Simpson try on the gloves at trial. In O.J.: Made in America, Marcia Clark claimed that she had implored Darden not to have Simpson try the gloves on, and they had fought many times about it. Though Darden accepted, Bailey fooled him into having Simpson try them on, stating that if he didn't, the defense would. The gloves not fitting was national news because of the perceived impact it had on the jurors and also universally recognized as a prosecutorial blunder. Bugliosi was very critical of Darden and wrote that asking Simpson to don the gloves was akin to asking Simpson if he was guilty and expecting him to reply affirmatively. Juror Brenda Moran said she acquitted Simpson because the gloves didn't fit, but juror Lionel Cryer said the glove demonstration was pointless because it was obvious they had changed from their original condition because Darden produced a new pair of the same type gloves, and they fit Simpson just fine.

In O.J.: Made in America, Simpson's sports agent, Mike Gilbert, claimed that before the glove demonstration, he advised Simpson to stop taking his arthritis medication so that his hands would swell and not fit the gloves. On The Rich Eisen Show, however, defense attorney Carl E. Douglas disputed Gilbert's claim as preposterous, and said that the defense team was unaware that there would be a glove demonstration at all, even though Bailey had already admitted in O.J.: Made in America that they were aware of the coming demonstration and that he had fooled Darden into having Simpson try the gloves on so that it would be seen as a mistake on the prosecution's part and not the defense's.

=== Exclusion of incriminating evidence ===
Prosecutor William Hodgman, prior to being replaced as Clark's co-counsel, decided not to introduce the evidence of the Bronco chase, the suicide note, the items found inside the Bronco and the video of Simpson's police interview. Clark agreed and chose not to present it after Hodgman was replaced.

Bugliosi was very critical of Clark's decision because that particular evidence was very incriminating: Simpson admitted in the police interview that he cut his finger and bled all over his house, driveway, and Bronco the same day as the murders; Simpson gave conflicting alibis to the public (he told Alan Park the limo driver that he overslept and then had a shower; but in contradiction, limo driver Park testified he had seen Simpson dressed in black clothes enter his house moments earlier; and Robert Shapiro claimed Simpson was in Chicago at a golf conference the night of the murders).

Robert Shapiro in a letter (which Robert Kardashian read on live television) apologized to the family of Ron Goldman, for what could only been Ron's murder because: the two had never met; Simpson took his passport when he fled, implying Simpson intended to flee the United States; and so he wouldn't be recognized, Simpson carried a disguise kit.

Clark agreed with Bugliosi that this evidence was incriminating, but Clark defended her decision to not offer it at trial, noting the public was already aware that Simpson's actions implied guilt; thousands of people were supporting Simpson's attempt to flee prosecution; and many citizens were overall sympathetic to Simpson and his feelings of guilt.

Jeffrey Toobin stated: by the time trial commenced jurors were already aware of the Bronco chase, the suicide note, and the items found in the Bronco. Plus, like most everyone worldwide, the jurors too had stopped what they were doing to watch the chase on TV. Despite these incriminating details, Toobin opines the jurors decided to disregard them nonetheless.

=== Dropping the domestic violence portion of the case ===
Prosecutor Marcia Clark was the one who decided to drop the domestic violence portion of the case halfway through presenting it. Darden wrote that the domestic violence was the motive for the murders. Vincent Bugliosi wrote he would have gone into more detail about it and noted that the abuse had turned public opinion against Simpson and opined that it would have also turned the jury against him as well if Clark and Darden had presented it better, writing that juror Brenda Moran claiming that domestic abuse being irrelevant to murder was the same as claiming that overeating was irrelevant to obesity. Daniel M. Petrocelli credited the difference in the outcome in civil trial to the jury being receptive to the argument that domestic abuse is a prelude to murder.

Darden wrote that the presentation of that part of the case was hampered by Judge Ito ruling the letters and statements by Nicole inadmissible as hearsay. Witness accounts were admissible, but Ito again delayed the prosecution from calling them until after all the forensic evidence had been presented. By then, Darden wrote, the jury was exhausted and appeared disinterested in hearing anymore about the abuse. Clark claimed she dropped it because she felt the DNA evidence in the case was insurmountable, but the media speculated it was due to the comments by dismissed juror Jeanette Harris, and Darden confirmed that to be true. Harris was a victim of domestic violence but failed to disclose it and was dismissed as a result. But afterwards, she gave an interview and called Simpson's abuse of Brown "a whole lot of nothing" and said other jurors on the panel felt the same way. In Evidence Dismissed and Murder in Brentwood, Detectives Lange, Vannatter and Fuhrman all wrote that they considered the history of domestic violence to be a weak motive for murder as well.

=== Changing the venue ===
In Outrage, Bugliosi criticized the prosecution for holding the trial in downtown Los Angeles rather than Santa Monica where the murders took place.

Alan Dershowitz stated the prosecution did this intentionally, but Toobin wrote that changing the venue is the domain of the courts, not the district attorney, and the trial "could never have been held anywhere except the criminal courts building in downtown Los Angeles" because that was the only area at the time that could accommodate it.

In his book Reasonable Doubts written just after the trial, Dershowitz wrote about the choice to have the trial downtown was not just about accommodations. From a legal point of view he wrote that the District Attorney Garcetti wanted to use a grand jury which gave them a legal advantage because they would not have to share the evidence they had to get the indictment of OJ Simpson. A grand jury would not have been an option at one of the smaller courts away from downtown.

Dershowitz also wrote about the race factor and the Rodney King case as motivation that Garcetti had to move the trial downtown, in his book he quoted journalist William Lockman’s work: “After the Rodney King fiasco, Garcetti didn’t want OJ Simpson being found guilty by a predominantly white jury”.

Darden wrote in his book In Contempt that it was hypocritical to criticize the defense for allegedly trying to seat black jurors while also criticizing the prosecution for not wanting to hold the trial in Santa Monica so there would be fewer black jurors.

During the jury selection process, both the defense and the prosecution were accused of intentionally trying to seat or exclude black jurors respectively which was illegal because California courts barred peremptory challenges to jurors based on race in People v. Wheeler.

=== Mark Fuhrman ===
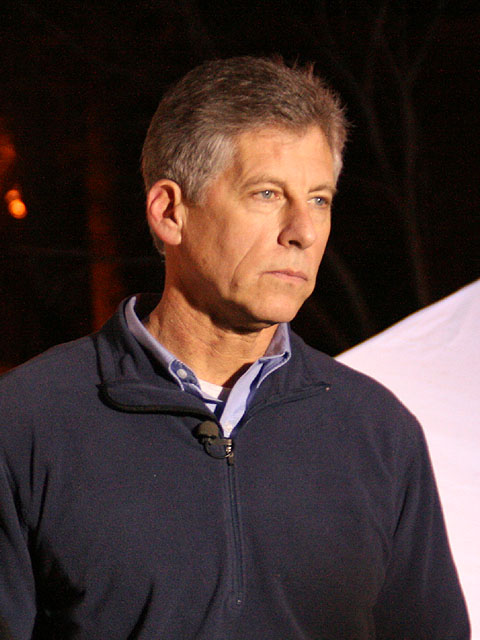
Mark Fuhrman

In Outrage, Bugliosi criticized Marcia Clark and Chris Darden for their remarks about Mark Fuhrman in their closing arguments, in which Clark referred to him as a racist, "the worst the LAPD has to offer" and essentially wishing a person like him never born, and Darden claiming that he would never again refer to him as "Detective Fuhrman" on the basis that he did not warrant the title, both of them essentially strengthening the defense's claims about race.

Bugliosi cited a case which Fuhrman had worked on in October 1994, in which Arrick Harris, an African-American male narcotics dealer, had been falsely accused of murdering a white male who he had previously threatened to kill, but had later been freed based on evidence that Fuhrman himself had discovered, and criticized Clark for not bringing it up to refute the defense's claim that Fuhrman was racist.

Detectives Lange and Vanatter agreed with Bugliosi, stating that Clark went too far and her closing argument actually did more to damage the LAPD's credibility in the eyes of the jury, while Bugliosi also criticized Clark and Darden for not confronting Fuhrman about his history of using racial epithets from the beginning and instructing him to tell the truth on the witness stand if asked about it by the defense in order to portray himself as an honest witness. Vannatter conceded in an interview that the LAPD contacted the wrong prosecutor. Lange and Vannatter also criticized Fuhrman for committing perjury and then pleading the fifth. Lange in particular criticized Fuhrman for using racial epithets in such a disparaging way on tape without expecting any possible future consequences.

In Outrage, Bugliosi also cited that following the trial, co-prosecutor Bill Hodgman had claimed that he had evidence of Fuhrman working hard to exonerate more African-Americans, and criticized him for not producing it. Bugliosi also pointed out that fourteen uniformed officers, most of whom had never met Fuhrman, arrived at the crime scene and saw only one glove before Fuhrman arrived. Also, they faulted Clark and Darden for producing only two of them instead of all fourteen to clarify that there was only one glove, and thus it would have been impossible for Fuhrman to plant a second glove or for Lange, Vannatter or Fung to plant any evidence at Simpson's estate without being seen, only unless it was a conspiracy between several different unconnected divisions of the LAPD, the LAPD crime lab, and the two private crime labs which also received the blood samples, which Bugliosi dismissed as an impossibility.

Fuhrman himself claimed that to believe that he planted the second glove would be as absurd as believing that he planted Kato Kaelin, Simpson's friend who was sleeping at Simpson's guesthouse on the night of the murders and who testified that he heard three loud thumps like an earthquake coming from the same area where Fuhrman found the second glove, and pointed out that while Johnnie Cochran and F. Lee Bailey were accusing him of planting the glove by placing it in a plastic bag and stuffing it in his sock so it would not be seen, they did not once subpoena his clothes from the night of the murders to look for any actual physical proof of their allegations, which proved that both Cochran and Bailey knew that Fuhrman was innocent of any crimes but were deliberately lying to the predominantly-black jury to play on their emotions and get a racially motivated jury nullification.

In 2006, one year after Cochran died, in an interview with Judith Regan for If I Did It, Simpson conceded that he "must have" dropped one glove at the crime scene because that was where the police found it, directly contradicting Cochran and Bailey's claims that a different killer had left two gloves at the crime scene and Fuhrman had planted one of them on Simpson's property to frame him. Though the interview was not broadcast until 2018, the book was published in 2007, and even though the book included Simpson's concession, Bailey continued to assert until his passing in June 2021 that Fuhrman planted the glove.

In O.J.: Made in America, Fuhrman claimed that in 1985, he had responded to a 911 call from Nicole and witnessed Simpson threatening Nicole with a baseball bat, and had to threaten Simpson with physical violence to make him drop the bat, but Nicole declined to press charges. During the trial, both Cochran and Bailey cited this encounter as Fuhrman's motive to frame Simpson, but claimed that it was based on his dislike for interracial couples, conveniently omitting that Fuhrman had stopped Simpson from potentially murdering Nicole in 1985.

After the trial, pressure was put on district attorney Gil Garcetti by the African American community to prosecute Fuhrman, which resulted in Fuhrman pleading no contest to a felony perjury charge and being fired from the LAPD, which angered Bugliosi among others, since the same had not been applied to the defense witnesses and experts who later admitted that they had deliberately committed perjury in Simpson's favor about facts which actually were relevant to the case. Ironically, Fuhrman, who was the prosecution's star witness, was the only one who was convicted on charges stemming from the Simpson trial, which led to Bugliosi referring to him as a "victim".

Both Bugliosi and Fuhrman asserted Section 128 of the California Penal Code that states that planting evidence in a capital offense warrants the death penalty, but in a televised debate between Bugliosi and Dershowitz on a June 11, 1996 edition of Larry King Live, Dershowitz dismissed Section 128 as a lie and continued to assert that Fuhrman and Vannatter had planted evidence and lied on the witness stand.

Writer Dominick Dunne was quoted as saying it seemed as if using racial epithets had briefly become a worse crime than murder, and criticized Johnnie Cochran for repeatedly describing his defense as a "search for truth" while he himself was knowingly lying and manipulating the jury based on facts irrelevant to the case itself.

Fuhrman compared his situation to that of Joseph Wambaugh, a former LAPD detective who had written a semi-fictional novel, The Choirboys, in which the same racial epithets were uttered by the main characters, and pointed out the hypocrisy that nobody had accused Wambaugh of racism or white supremacy while he had been condemned by the public for doing the same for a fictional screenplay, and criticized the prosecution for abandoning him instead of presenting the screenplay or any witnesses who would prove its fictitious nature, such as the agent in charge of its publication or the screenplay's producers.

== Criticism of the defense ==
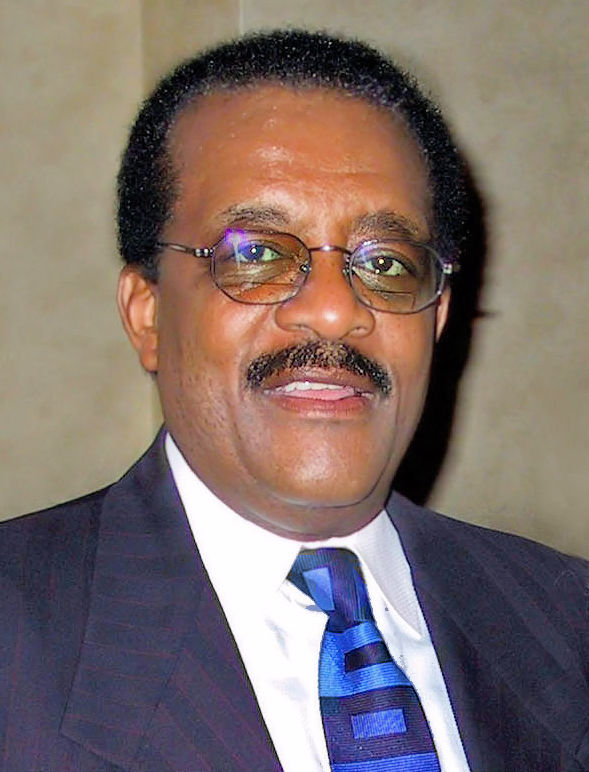
While Johnnie Cochran was hailed as a hero by the general African-American community for getting Simpson acquitted, he was widely criticized by both whites and blacks and perceived as a racist himself for allegedly turning the murder trial into a race trial

=== "Race Card" ===
In July, polling suggested that 90% of African Americans did not believe that race was a factor in the murders of Brown and Goldman. The controversy of the June 27 Time Magazine cover, which had a darkened mugshot of Simpson, seemed to have generated sympathy for Simpson due to allegations of racism, even though he had been accused of a double murder. Shapiro admitted the defense played the "race card from the bottom of the deck". Dershowitz, who later criticized Cochran for introducing race into the trial, later wrote in Reasonable Doubts: The Criminal Justice System and the O.J. Simpson Case that "we played the only card we could".

Darden stated that allowing the defense to question the police about racism in the LAPD "will upset the black jurors; it will issue a test and the test will be: Whose side are you on? The side of the white policeman or the side of the black defendant and his very prominent and black lawyer." In O.J.: Made in America, Jeffrey Toobin agreed with Darden's initial request of banning racial issues from the trial because they were irrelevant and "would blind the jury...and cause extreme prejudice to the prosecutions case" as Darden stated. Toobin opines that while Cochran's closing statement is best known for his phrase, "If it doesn't fit, you must acquit", the question that Cochran was truly putting to the jury was "Whose side are you on?" Dismissed juror Jeanette Harris confirmed that the jury was dividing themselves along racial lines as a result of race being introduced into the trial. Cochran's statements during his summation also suggest this as well: "If you grew up in this country, then you know there are Fuhrmans out there" was a naked appeal to racial solidarity to the black jurors according to Toobin and his statement "acquit Simpson and send the police a message" was an appeal for a jury nullification for the murders according to Alan Dershowitz. After the verdict was read, juror Lionel Cryer gave Simpson a Raised fist black power salute.

"I never believed that Simpson was being victimized by a racist police organization because he was black…or that he was seen as a black hero".

— Robert Shapiro, The Search for Justice

Robert Shapiro wrote in The Search for Justice: A Defense Attorney's Brief on the O.J. Simpson Case that Cochran introducing race into the trial is the primary factor that drove the Dream Team apart: "Race is not the issue...A defense built on race will never help us." Shapiro wrote that Cochran used race to argue for a jury nullification in his summations, Bailey used it to argue that Fuhrman planted the glove, Scheck used it to argue his blood planting claims, and Dershowitz used it to support his police conspiracy allegation. Regarding Bailey, Scheck and Dershowitz's conspiracy claims, Shapiro wrote he doesn't believe that Simpson was framed by the police. After his closing argument, in which he compared Fuhrman to Adolf Hitler, Cochran received numerous death threats, and hired bodyguards from Louis Farrakhan, the leader of the Nation of Islam, which particularly angered Shapiro, who is Jewish, as Farrakhan was famous for his black supremacist and anti-Semitic views. Fred Goldman, Ron Goldman's father and also Jewish, was also angered by Cochran's comments and referred to him as a "sick man" and "the worst kind of racist himself" for speaking about racism and associating himself with Farrakhan at the same time. After the verdict, Shapiro stated in an interview with Barbara Walters that he would never work with Cochran or speak with Bailey again, though he would still be open to working with Scheck.

Sociology professor Harry Edwards stated that "[Simpson's] sentiments were, 'I'm not black, I'm O.J.'" regarding his apathy towards racial issues. Vincent Bugliosi criticized the prosecution in Outrage for not using aspects of Simpson's personal life to refute the defense's claim that he was a hero of the black community - he left his black wife for a white woman, had affairs only with white women, had two biracial children, moved into a white neighborhood and after divorcing had a white girlfriend. The defense was aware of all of this and made attempts to conceal it. Robert Kardashian admitted during an interview with Barbara Walters that, prior to the jurors visiting Simpson's home, the defense had staged his home and switched out his photos of white women for black women and children, including switching a picture of a nude Paula Barbieri (Simpson's girlfriend at the time, who was white) for a Norman Rockwell painting from Cochran's office. In O.J.: Made in America, Carl E. Douglas defended the decision to redecorate Simpson's home to manipulate the jury, and stated that had the jury been predominantly Latin, they would have had placed pictures of Simpson wearing a sombrero, hired a mariachi band to perform outside his house, and placed a piñata at the top of the staircase.

In Outrage, Bugliosi pointed out that instead of defending Simpson or attacking the physical evidence that implicated him for the murders, Cochran and Scheck dedicated their entire closing summations to attacking the LAPD, in stark contrast to normal criminal trial procedures, accusing Lange, Vannatter, Fuhrman and the LAPD crime labs of conspiring to frame Simpson for the two murders and lying in court without providing any evidence. While many accused the defense of using the race card to play on the jury's emotions and manipulate them into distrusting the LAPD in order to get a "not guilty" verdict, both Cochran and Douglas disputed it, claiming that they played the "credibility card", even though they had put particular emphasis on Fuhrman's past of using racial epithets instead of finding actual evidence to prove he may have been a dishonest cop in general. In O.J.: Made in America, while Douglas continued to claim that they played the credibility card instead of the race card, he also claimed that it was hypocritical of Robert Shapiro to decry the defense for playing the race card and that to not do so would have been contrary to their oaths as advocates for Simpson. In an interview about Outrage, radio host Larry Elder claimed that he had spoken with his friend, Barbara Berry Cochran, Johnnie Cochran's ex-wife who Cochran himself had physically abused numerous times during their marriage, and asked her if she believed Cochran truly believed in Simpson's innocence, but Barbara responded that Cochran did not concern himself with his clients' guilt or innocence and the only thing he was interested in when taking a case was his fee.

=== Unethical behavior ===
Jurors Cooley, Bess and Rubin-Jackson wrote in A Rush to Judgement? that Barry Scheck was the most persuasive attorney at the trial. Vincent Bugliosi, Darnel M. Hunt, Daniel M. Petrocelli, and defense witness Henry Lee all wrote that Scheck made many misleading claims in trying to convince the jury there was reasonable doubt about the physical evidence. Hunt wrote in O. J. Simpson Facts and Fictions: News Rituals in the Construction of Reality that Scheck "floated ridiculous conspiracy theories to the jury". Jeffrey Toobin wrote in The Run of His Life: The People v. O.J. Simpson that "the most remarkable thing was that Scheck actually accomplished this goal...Scheck's arguments presupposed a conspiracy so immense within the LAPD that, analyzed objectively, it seemed a practical impossibility but Scheck made his theories real for the jury, and for that reason he was primarily responsible for that verdict."

In Triumph of Justice: Closing the Book on the O.J. Simpson Saga, Petrocelli explains how he disproved all of Scheck's blood planting claims. Scheck implied that Vannatter could have planted Simpson's blood at the crime scene when he returned later that evening to Simpson's home to deliver his blood reference vial to Dennis Fung, but the crime scene was actually at Nicole Brown's home. Scheck then suggested that another police officer could have "sprinkled Simpson's blood at the crime scene" but the prosecution demonstrated that the blood was photographed being there prior to Simpson's blood being drawn by the nurse. Scheck then implied that Vannatter could have planted the victims blood in the Bronco when he returned to Simpson's home, but the Bronco had been impounded prior to his arrival and wasn't even there. Scheck then suggested that the victims' blood in the Bronco could be the result of contamination in the LAPD crime lab, but defense witness Lee wrote in Blood Evidence: How DNA Is Revolutionizing the Way We Solve Crimes the prosecution disproved that claim when the second collection from the Bronco returned the same matches as the first collection, proving they weren't contaminates. Scheck then produced two witnesses who claimed there was no blood in the impounded Bronco implying the blood was planted by the police afterwards, but the prosecution produced photographs of the blood in the impounded Bronco which disproved that fraud claim as well. The New York Times reported that "Mr. Simpson's "Dream Team" has fostered public mistrust of defense lawyers in general because of their 'shotgun approach' of attempting to shoot down every scrap of evidence against Mr. Simpson with a barrage of alternative (i.e., conspiracy) explanations" and in 2014, Scheck acknowledged that public perception of defense attorneys changed as a result of his blood planting claims at the trial.

Darden wrote in In Contempt that nearly all of Scheck's blood planting claims were originally made by Stephen Singular in his book proposal for Legacy of Deception: An Investigation of Mark Fuhrman and Racism in the L.A.P.D. The key difference is that he claimed that Fuhrman, not Vannatter, planted all of the blood evidence. Singular cited an unnamed source in the LAPD, but both Johnnie Cochran and Carl Douglas dismissed Singular’s claims because Fuhrman never had access to Simpson's reference vial. Reporters Philip Bosco and Tracie Savage both reported that another unnamed source in the LAPD had told them the match of Nicole Brown's blood on the socks in September and allegedly before the test was even done. The defense argued this meant the blood was planted because the source already knew what the result would be and wanted Savage testify to that. Like Singular, neither reporter revealed who the source was, and Ito ruled it was irrelevant for them to do so because the claim was "bogus": the test was actually done on August 4, a month before not after, the source revealed the match. Savage has since then disowned that claim entirely.

Other members of the Dream Team produced witnesses that gave misleading testimony. Cochran produced LAPD videographer Willie Ford who showed a video of Simpson's bedroom without the socks present which Cochran implied proves they were planted, but Ford admitted the video was made after the socks had already been collected. Blood spatter expert Herbert MacDonell stated that the only way the stains observed on the socks could be made was if the blood was planted on the sock after it had been taken off, but admitted that the same pattern can be produced if Simpson simply touched the socks after removing them. Willie L. Williams, the LAPD police chief at the time who himself was African-American, stated regarding the defense's conspiracy claims: "It is unconscionable that you would paint a picture where you would have detectives, police officers, civilian laboratory people and others decide to plot against Mr. Simpson, carry it out, all keep quiet and not have anyone break it,” Williams said. “It's too fanciful to imagine. . . . It's something that belongs down in Disneyland.”

==== Witness perjury ====
Sylvia Guerra, a housekeeper for Simpson's neighbor claimed that she and another housekeeper, Rosa Lopez, were both offered $5,000 to lie and say that they saw Simpson's Bronco parked in front of his house on the night of the murders. The tow truck driver John Meraz and William Blasini Jr both testified that there was no blood in the impounded Bronco despite photographs of the blood that clearly demonstrate they were lying. None of the perjurers for the defense, however, were punished for their crimes, which angered many, since Mark Fuhrman, the prosecution's star witness, was prosecuted and fired from the LAPD after much pressure from the African-American community for his perjury about facts irrelevant to the case, making his conviction the only one as a result of the case. In Outrage, Bugliosi claimed that Fuhrman was a victim in the case and that his lying under oath about racial epithets did not rise to the level of indictable perjury because it was immaterial to the actual facts of the case.

==== Unreliable Expert Testimony ====
Simpson's Dream Team retained many high-profile experts. Many of them were initially approached by the prosecution, but decided to represent Simpson instead because of the larger retainers. The conventional wisdom at the time is that experts can only truthfully represent one side of a case because it is presumed that their interpretation of the facts would be the same regardless of who retains them. The Simpson case challenged that belief because experts in this case gave testimony that favored Simpson but contradicted many of their claims they had made in previous cases. In the aftermath of the verdict, many of the experts began walking back their claims due to the negative impact the case had had on their careers.

===== Lenore Walker =====
Frequency tree of 100 000 battered American women showing the prosecutor's fallacy in OJ Simpson's murder trial, by CMG Le

The defense retained renowned advocate for victims of domestic abuse, Lenore E. Walker. Cochran said she would testify that Simpson doesn't fit the profile of an abuser that would murder his spouse, but she was dropped from the witness list for "tactical reasons" after her report on the case concluded that "80.3% of murdered spouses who were also victims of abuse were in fact killed by their current or ex-husband." Walker's colleagues were appalled by her decision to defend Simpson and accused her of betraying her advocacy for a $250,000 retainer by knowingly giving testimony that contradicted her own research as her report demonstrated. The National Coalition Against Domestic Violence wrote of Walker's assessment of Simpson "[it] is absolutely the opposite of the assessment of most battered women's advocates in this country.” During the civil trial, Walker dropped Simpson as a client and testified against him instead for the Goldmans. Walker would later write that “[After] the O.J. Simpson trial, I was dismissed from a position on the national crisis helpline advisory board of directors, my theories were openly denigrated… and I was disinvited to participate in many conferences with funding from the same government sources that previously invited me along with others who continued to participate.”

===== Michael Baden =====
Michael Baden, a forensic pathologist, testified that the murders happened closer to 11:00pm, which is when Simpson has an alibi and stated that Brown was still conscious, standing, and took a step after her throat was cut and that Goldman was standing and fighting his assailant for ten minutes with a lacerated jugular vein. Daniel M. Petrocelli wrote in Triumph of Justice: Closing the Book on the Simpson Saga that Baden's claims were nonsensical and he tried to avoid making them again at the civil trial. The claim that Brown was standing and conscious after her throat was slashed was untenable because the injury severed her cervical spinal cord which would have paralyzed her from the neck down. His claim of Goldman's ten minute struggle was also untenable as well because it only takes five minutes for someone to completely exsanguinate from such an injury. Baden admitted his claim of Goldman's long struggle was inaccurate at the civil trial and would later say that testifying for Simpson was a mistake because he was consistently being discredited for the claims that he made at the trial that he later admitted were not true.

Vincent Bugliosi wrote in Outrage: The Five Reasons Why O. J. Simpson Got Away with Murder that Baden's claims were "silly" and claimed that he knowingly gave false testimony in order to collect a $100,000 retainer because the week before he testified, Gerdes admitted that Goldman's blood was in Simpson's Bronco despite Goldman never having an opportunity within his lifetime to be in the Bronco. Christopher Darden opined in In Contempt that prosecutor Brian Kelberg irritated Baden when he implied that he was being "rented out" by Simpson, and he responded by making those absurd claims to get back at him.

===== Fredrich Rieders =====
In Blood Evidence: How DNA is revolutionizing the way we solve crimes, Lee writes that Fredric Rieders was initially approached by the prosecution to interpret the results from the EDTA testing, but he chose to represent Simpson instead. His decision ended up being a mistake because the defense ultimately withheld key details that would have resulted in him not testifying. His testimony that the presence of EDTA suggested the blood was planted from the reference vials gave the appearance of scientific credence to the defense's fraud claims. However, the defense neglected to mention to Rieders that one of those blood drops had been photographed being there prior to the reference vial existing, proving it couldn't have come from there. Furthermore, Detective Vannatter, who was accused of planting the other blood drop on the sock, never went inside the evidence van where the socks were stored, which proves he didn't plant that blood either. FBI special agent Roger Martz later demonstrated that the results were actually false positives from having tested the reference vials first before the evidence samples.

Thomas Lambert accused Rieders of knowingly giving false testimony at the criminal trial in exchange for a $46,000 retainer because there was clear evidence that the results were not reliable: the blood on the back tested positive for the presence of EDTA despite it being impossible to have come from the reference vial, the substrate control for that blood drop tested positive for EDTA despite having no blood on it at all, the results for the two evidence samples and Agent Martz's unpreserved blood were exactly the same and nowhere near the levels seen in the reference vials, and Rieders himself said that it was impossible for Agent Martz to have that much EDTA in his unpreserved blood. In Triumph of Justice, Petrocelli wrote that Robbin Cotton had conclusively proven at the civil trial that it was impossible for the blood on the socks to have come from Brown's reference vial by showing that the blood in the reference vial was more degraded than the blood on the sock, which is impossible if that was its source. Afterwards, Rieders conceded "this might not be blood from a purple top test tube".

In Outrage, Bugliosi opined if the tests had been done correctly, they would have conclusively disproven the blood planting claims. In Run of his Life, Toobin wrote that the prosecution did prove that no EDTA was present, but the testimony was "highly technical". Lee in Blood Evidence wrote that the testimony of Rieders and Agent Martz was almost incomprehensible and opines that the jury believed Rieders over Martz because he was a renowned scholar even though Martz had evidence and literature to back up his conclusions.

===== Henry Lee =====
Bugliosi in Outrage wrote that Lee knowingly gave misleading testimony and allowed Scheck to imply he supported the fraud claims. Lee's "something's wrong" claim implying the police planted one of the blood swatches at the crime scene because it had a wet transfer stain on it was nonsensical because that swatch doesn't incriminate Simpson: the blood belonged to Brown and was found at the crime scene next to her body. Furthermore, Bugliosi wrote that Lee was aware that Scheck was arguing that Dennis Fung had tampered with the swatches and seriously doubted that the Chinese-born scientist really believed that the Chinese-American criminalist would participate in a racially motivated conspiracy to frame Simpson. In Triumph of Justice, Petrocelli wrote that Henry Lee clarified his statements and said "I never meant to imply there was scientific fact to show that any LA police officer planted or did anything, cheating, with any evidence when I said "something's wrong". I did not testify to that." Regarding the wet transfer stain, the prosecution said the wet stain was simply due to one of the swatches still being wet, and Lee admitted "I offered that same explanation since day one".

===== John Gerdes =====
According to Dr. Henry Lee in Blood Evidence: How DNA is revolutionizing the way we solve crimes, Gerdes "had no experience whatsoever in forensic DNA matching" and made more factually inaccurate claims than any other witness at the criminal trial. Darden wrote in In Contempt that all of Gerdes's claims were misleading conjecture. None of the defense attorneys in their books about the trial - Shapiro, Dershowitz, Cochran, or Uelman - mention Gerdes, even though the jurors in A Rush to Judgement? specifically cite him as the one who raised what they believed to be reasonable doubt about the DNA evidence. In Outrage, Bugliosi opines the reason why is because "contamination cannot change someone's DNA into someone else's" which is what the jurors believed to be true. Howard Coleman, president of GeneLex, a Seattle-based forensic DNA laboratory, called the contamination claim "smoke and mirrors" and said "everything we get in the lab is contaminated to some degree. What contamination and degradation will lead you to is an inconclusive result. It doesn't lead you to a false positive."

Lee explained in Blood Evidence why he rejected Gerdes's claims. Gerdes claimed that contamination could happen from repeated use of the reagents used for amplification, but neglected to mention that all the reagents tested negative for contamination. Petrocelli wrote in Triumph of Justice that Gerdes lied when he said that Collin Yamauchi spilled Simpson's blood in the lab. Gerdes claimed that the results from the second Bronco collection were unreliable because the car had been burglarized, but admitted the DNA matches are the same before and afterwards, disproving that claim. Rantala wrote that Gerdes's most misleading claim came when he implied that the evidence locker was in the PCR amplification room when he said that Yamauchi took the PCR extraction product back to "the same location". Rantala wrote that Gerdes said that so his contamination claim would be plausible, but knew that wasn't the case because he toured the lab and knew that wasn't true. Lee wrote in Blood Evidence that "Gerdes conceded the PCR extraction product was not returned to the specific area near the extraction room or evidence-handling area but was taken to a completely separate area located a comfortable distance away making a contamination scenario highly improbable".

Pundits were skeptical of Gerdes claims too because he was not the defense's first choice: renowned forensic DNA expert, Edward Blake, was supposed to be making the case for contamination, but was dropped from the witness list after rejecting it. They also noted that Gerdes claimed it was impossible to distinguish blood from the reference vials from blood from the body despite Rieders demonstrating just that the week prior using EDTA. That false claim notwithstanding, his testimony wasn't reliable, they said, because he was clearly pandering to the defense: all of his contamination occurred through random carelessness in the lab, yet the only three matches he said were valid were the same three the defense claimed were planted, while the remaining 58 matches were all false positives, despite admitting that has never happened before. The substrate controls that are used to determine if contamination like he was suggesting occurred were also coincidentally all false negatives. So Gerdes was claiming that the contamination only got on the evidence items despite they and the substrate controls all being handled interchangeably at the same time. Clinical molecular geneticist Brad Popovich called Gerdes's claims "ridiculous".

Thomas Lambert was given high marks for his cross-examination of Gerdes forcing him to admit "there's no direct evidence of contamination in any of the test results that I looked at in this case." Prosecutor and DNA expert George "Woody" Clarke wrote in Justice and Science: Trials and Triumphs of DNA Evidence that Gerdes's contamination claim was rejected by every DNA expert at the criminal trial. The only reason it appeared convincing to the jury is because Judge Lance Ito allowed Gerdes to testify for six hours about contamination that occurred years ago in other cases instead of narrowing his testimony to only incidents in this case of which there were none.

== Criticism of the court ==
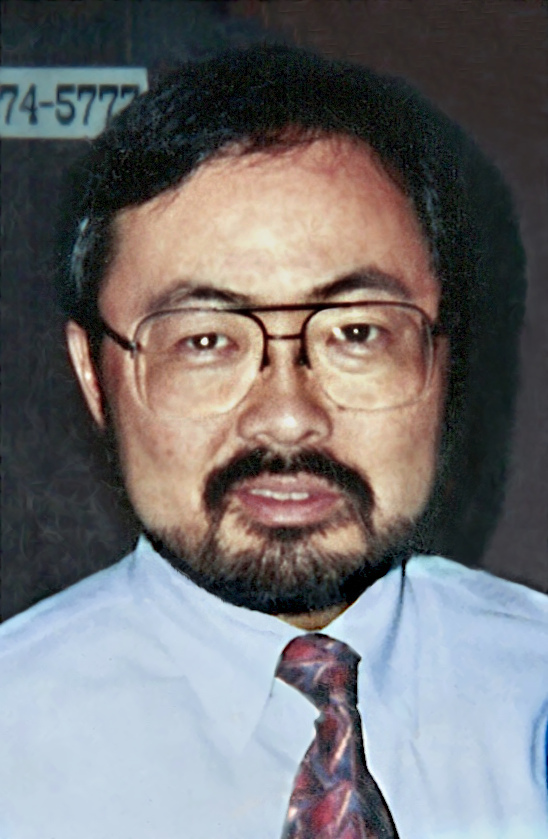
Judge Lance Ito was criticized for poor stewardship while presiding over the trial

Judge Lance Ito was criticized by Marcia Clark, Christopher Darden, Vincent Bugliosi, Daniel Petrocelli, Darnel Hunt, and Jeffrey Toobin for his alleged poor stewardship of the trial. The criticism focused on allegations that he failed to control the court room and was unduly influenced by the media. Critics often compare his stewardship to Judge Hiroshi Fujisaki who presided over the civil trial against Simpson.

=== Failure to control the courtroom ===
Defense attorney Robert Shapiro wrote in The Search for Justice that Ito gave Scheck and Cochran more latitude than what was normally permitted. For instance, he allowed Johnnie Cochran and Barry Scheck to interrupt Marcia Clark's summation sixty-one times. Out of courtesy and as a matter of legal strategy, legal teams generally avoid interrupting opposing counsel's closing statements. Bugliosi wrote in Outrage that "Cochran and Scheck were deliberately making frivolous objections (the proof is that Ito sustained only two out of the seventy-one objections)...yet Judge Ito did not once hold Cochran or Scheck in contempt of court or even once admonish them to discontinue their outrageous, unprofessional, and yes, dishonorable conduct." Bugliosi added that had he been the one prosecuting Simpson, he would have said the following to Ito: "Judge Ito, you know, everyone in this courtroom knows that all of these objections, particularly those by Mr. Scheck, are completely frivolous, and designed solely to destroy the effectiveness of my final address to the jury. In all deference to you, Judge Ito, I'm not asking you, I'm demanding that the next time Mr. Scheck interrupts me with a silly objection, you hold him in contempt of court, and if he continues after that, I want Scheck in lockup. If either Mr. Cochran or Mr. Scheck continues to object and you let them get by with it, again in all deference to you, my remarks to you as well as to them will not be made here at the bench, but in open court, before the jury and the millions of people who are watching. I can assure these defense attorneys that they are not going to get by with this."

Bugliosi criticized Ito for allowing the defense to argue that evidence was tampered with despite him ruling "there is no concrete evidence of tampering". Fuhrman criticized Ito for allowing Cochran to say during summations that "he lied when he said he didn't plant the glove" despite Ito ruling "It is a theory without factual support." Prosecutor and DNA expert George "Woody" Clarke in Justice and Science: Trials and Triumphs of DNA Evidence criticized Ito because the only reason Gerdes' contamination claim appeared convincing to the jury was because Ito allowed him to testify for six hours about contaminations that occurred years ago in other cases instead of narrowing his testimony to only incidents in the Simpson case, of which there were none. Petrocelli opined in Triumph of Justice that "Ito had given the defense lawyers an astonishing amount of leeway...Ito did so because he believed, beyond any doubt... that Simpson would be found guilty, so he gave the defense every break and benefit so that when the inevitable appeal was filed, the verdict would be bulletproof."

=== Comparisons with Hiroshi Fujisaki ===
Superior Court Judge Hiroshi Fujisaki presided over the wrongful death civil trial and was praised for his stewardship as compared to Ito's at the criminal trial. Fujisaki gave neither Daniel M. Petrocelli, the plaintiff's attorney, nor Robert Baker, Simpson's attorney, any leeway beyond the scope of his rulings. Fujisaki prohibited all conspiracy claims because the defense could not provide any evidence supporting them and from attacking the LAPD, saying "attack the evidence, not the LAPD". Fujisaki allowed Gerdes to testify about contamination only in the Simpson case, because the other cases were "irrelevant because it did not address the actual DNA test results in Mr. Simpson's case." Gerdes later admitted there was no contamination in the Simpson case.

Fujisaki also prohibited the defense from referencing Fuhrman's racism or perjury at the civil trial because the defense could not "show it had anything directly to do with this case" and the perjury "was not material to any facts in this case". Fuhrman did not testify at the civil trial after invoking his Fifth Amendment rights, but Fujisaki ruled that the evidence that Fuhrman found was admissible because it was witnessed by the other officers present. Toobin wrote in Run of his Life that Fujisaki was given high marks for his stewardship of the civil trial. Robert Baker later said of Fujisaki, "He's just a good judge, unbiased and fair."

== Criticism of the public's sympathy for Simpson ==
Bruno Magli sales increased thirty per cent in 1996 and fifty percent in 1997. Subsequent owners Marquee stated the association was not one they welcomed or wished for, but acknowledged the increased public interest.

=== Influence on the court ===
Ito's decision to allow the trial to be televised was widely criticized. In 1998, Christopher Darden published his book, In Contempt, in which he criticized Ito as a "starstruck" judge who allowed the trial to turn into a media circus and the defense to control the court room while he collected hourglasses from fans and invited celebrities into his chambers. In an interview with Barbara Walters, Darden asserted his view that Johnnie Cochran was the one controlling the courtroom, not Ito.

=== Media manufactured reality ===
Bugliosi also criticized the media for sympathizing with Simpson throughout the entire trial, specifically for referring to his lawyers as the "Dream Team" or "the best defense money can buy" and for ridiculing Marcia Clark for her private life and appearance to the point that the National Enquirer printed nude pictures of her provided by her first husband's mother, and referring to Chris Darden as an "Uncle Tom" following an interview with Johnnie Cochran for helping to prosecute an African-American celebrity, which Bugliosi claims increased the defense's credibility in the jury's eyes while pointing out that Robert Shapiro was actually famous as a plea bargain lawyer who had never once tried a murder case, Johnnie Cochran as a civil rights lawyer who also had never tried a murder case (although the Cochran firm claimed that they had tried and won many criminal cases, Playboy magazine contacted them to name one such case, but never received an answer), Alan Dershowitz as an appeal lawyer (most notably enabling Claus von Bülow to have a second trial following his conviction for attempting to murder his wife, Sunny), and that though F. Lee Bailey was in fact a notable criminal trial lawyer, he himself was a convicted felon of DUI and had actually lost his most recent major criminal case, the Patty Hearst bank robbery, which was almost twenty years before the Simpson trial.

=== Damage to race relations ===
The public was aware of incriminating evidence that had been ruled inadmissible that the jurors never heard, yet African Americans were observed celebrating Simpson's acquittal despite this evidence never having been refuted at trial because it was never introduced. This led to a White backlash response to the acquittal that was later credited with why voters in California passed Proposition 209 that ended Affirmative Action the following year. The political impact the acquittal had on White Americans perception of issues of racism in the United States was summarized as thus:

"What was different and disturbing about the racial talk last week was that so many white liberals sounded fed up. Many middle class professionals who have always supported integration, maintained office and social friendships with African Americans, and resisted the backlash against affirmative action, were appalled by what black novelist Dennis Williams called the "end zone dance" over the Simpson acquittal. It made them wonder aloud whether they really knew African Americans as well as they thought they did, and whether the racial gap wasn't much wider than they had believed."

— Newsweek, October 16, 1995

=== If I Did It: Confessions of the Killer ===
If I Did It is a book written by Simpson and Pablo Fenjves, in which Simpson puts forth a hypothetical description of the murders. The book was written in conjunction with a 2006 interview between Simpson and Judith Regan. In both the book and interview, Simpson told his version of events on the night of the murders, where he initially admitted that he was present at the crime scene with an accomplice named Charlie, but later claimed that he had indeed been holding a knife and that he could not remember crucial details, claiming instead that he had lost consciousness and then seen Nicole and Ron's bodies, and very notably conceded to Regan that he had dropped one of the gloves there because the police found it. Since Simpson opened up the interview with the words, "No one knows this story the way I know it, because I know the facts better than anyone," his words were a direct contradiction of what Johnnie Cochran and Robert Shapiro had claimed at the criminal trial, that Simpson was in Chicago on the night of the murders and would not be able to know what happened. Though both the book and interview were cancelled due to public outrage, the publication rights of the book were awarded to the Goldman family to partially satisfy the civil trial judgment and was retitled If I Did It: Confessions of the Killer.

In 2018, Fox aired a special entitled O.J. Simpson: The Lost Confession? which featured footage from the interview, as well as analysis and discussion by host Soledad O'Brien, Regan, Darden, Nicole's friend Eve Shakti Chen, anti-domestic violence advocate Rita Smith, and retired FBI profiler Jim Clemente. It aired with limited commercial time, which was used to broadcast public service announcements addressing domestic violence. In the decade-old interview, Simpson initially used phrases like "I would" and "I'd think" in his hypothetical description of the event, but later moved to using first-person phrasing with sentences like "I remember I grabbed the knife", "I don't remember except I'm standing there", "I don't recall", and "I must have."

=== The People v. O. J. Simpson: American Crime Story ===
In 2016, FX developed and aired the first season of American Crime Story, which focused on the Simpson trial. Though the series was met with wide acclaim and won nine Emmy Awards, it was not without controversy, particularly for what was perceived as its sympathetic portrayals of Simpson and Kardashian and its unfairly maligned portrayals of both Cochran and Fuhrman.
