= Murder trial of O. J. Simpson =

1995 US criminal trial

People v. Simpson
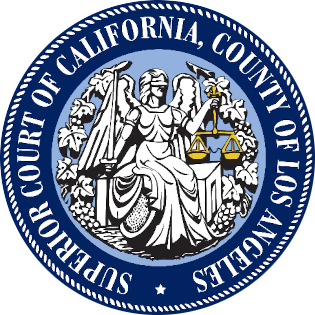
- Court: Superior Court of California in and for the County of Los Angeles
- Full case name: The People of the State of California v. Orenthal James Simpson
- Submitted: June 16, 1994
- Started: January 24, 1995
- Decided: October 3, 1995; 31 years ago
- Verdict: Not guilty in violation of Penal Code Section 187(a), a felony upon Nicole Brown Simpson. Not guilty in violation of Penal Code Section 187(a), a felony upon Ronald Lyle Goldman.
- Charge: First-degree murder with special circumstances (2 counts)

Case history
- Subsequent actions: Civil lawsuit filed by the Brown and Goldman families; Simpson was found responsible by a preponderance of the evidence for both deaths on February 4, 1997.

Court membership
- Judges sitting: Kathleen Kennedy-Powell (Preliminary hearing); Lance Ito (Trial)

The People of the State of California v. Orenthal James Simpson was a criminal trial in Los Angeles County Superior Court, in which former NFL player and actor O. J. Simpson was tried and acquitted for the murders of his ex-wife Nicole Brown Simpson and her friend Ron Goldman, who were stabbed to death outside Brown's home in Los Angeles on June 12, 1994. The trial spanned eight months, from January 24 to October 3, 1995.

Though prosecutors argued that Simpson was implicated by a significant amount of forensic evidence, he was acquitted of both murders on October 3. Commentators agree that to convince the jury to acquit Simpson, the defense capitalized on anger among the city's African-American community toward the Los Angeles Police Department (LAPD), which had a history of racial bias and had inflamed racial tensions in the beating of Rodney King and subsequent riots two years prior. The trial was often characterized by the media as "the trial of the century" because of its international publicity and has been described as the "most publicized" criminal trial in history. Simpson was formally charged with the murders on June 17; when he did not turn himself in at the agreed time, he became the subject of a police pursuit. TV stations interrupted coverage of game 5 of the 1994 NBA Finals to broadcast live coverage of the pursuit, which was watched by around 95 million people. The pursuit and Simpson's arrest were very widely publicized events in the United States.

Simpson was represented by a high-profile defense team, referred to as the "Dream Team", initially led by Robert Shapiro and subsequently directed by Johnnie Cochran. The team included F. Lee Bailey, Alan Dershowitz, Robert Kardashian, Shawn Holley, Carl E. Douglas, Barry Scheck, and Gerald Uelmen. Simpson was also instrumental in his own defense. While Deputy District Attorneys Marcia Clark, William Hodgman, and Christopher Darden believed they had a strong case, the defense team persuaded the jury there was reasonable doubt concerning the DNA evidence. They contended the blood sample had been mishandled by lab scientists and that the case had been tainted by LAPD misconduct related to racism and incompetence. The use of DNA evidence in trials was relatively new, and many laypersons did not understand how to evaluate it.

The trial was considered significant for the wide division in reaction to the verdict. Observers' opinions of the verdict were largely related to their ethnicity; the media dubbed this the "racial gap". A poll of Los Angeles County residents showed most African Americans thought the "not guilty" verdict was justified while most White respondents thought it was a racially motivated jury nullification by the mostly African-American jury. Polling in later years showed the gap had narrowed since the trial; more than half of polled Black respondents expressed the belief that Simpson was guilty. In 2017, three jurors who acquitted Simpson said they would still vote to acquit, while one said he would convict.

After the trial, Goldman's father filed a civil suit against Simpson. In 1997, the jury unanimously found Simpson responsible for the deaths of Goldman and Brown. The Goldman family was awarded damages totaling $34 million ($67 million adjusted for inflation), but as of 2024 have received a small portion of that.

== Murders and Simpson's arrest ==
Brown met Simpson in 1977 when she was 18 and working as a waitress. Simpson and Brown married on February 2, 1985 and had two children together. Their marriage was described as involving domestic violence, with Brown writing that Simpson had beaten her on multiple occasions.

On June 12, 1994, Brown and Goldman were murdered outside Brown's condominium, 875 South Bundy Drive. Simpson was charged with the murders and after failing to turn himself in to the police on June 17, he became a fugitive. A low-speed chase was broadcast live on television as Simpson fled in Cowlings’ white Ford Bronco SUV with friend Al Cowlings before surrendering to authorities at his Brentwood estate.

== Preliminary hearing ==
On June 20, Simpson was arraigned and pleaded not guilty to both murders and was held without bail. The following day, a grand jury was called to determine whether to indict him for the two murders but was dismissed on June 23, as a result of excessive media coverage that could have influenced its neutrality. Instead, authorities held a probable cause hearing to determine whether to bring Simpson to trial. California Superior Court Judge Kathleen Kennedy-Powell ruled on July 7 that there was sufficient evidence to bring Simpson to trial for the murders. At his second arraignment on July 22, when asked how he pleaded to the murders, Simpson firmly stated: "Absolutely, one hundred percent, not guilty."

Jill Shively testified to the grand jury that soon after the time of the murders she saw a white Ford Bronco speeding away from Bundy Drive in such a hurry that it almost collided with a Nissan at the intersection of Bundy and San Vicente Boulevard, and that she recognized Simpson's voice. She talked to the television show Hard Copy for $5,000, after which prosecutors declined to use her testimony at trial.

Jose Camacho of Ross Cutlery provided store receipts showing Simpson had purchased a 12-inch (305 mm) stiletto knife six weeks before the murders. The knife was recovered and determined to be similar to the one the coroner said caused the stab wounds. The prosecution did not present this evidence at trial, after Camacho sold his story to the National Enquirer for $12,500. Tests on the knife determined that an oil used on new cutlery was still present on the knife, indicating it had never been used.

Former NFL player and pastor Rosey Grier visited Simpson on November 13 at the Los Angeles County Jail. A jailhouse guard, Jeff Stuart, testified to Judge Ito that at one point Simpson yelled to Grier that he "didn't mean to do it", after which Grier had urged Simpson to come clean. Ito ruled that the evidence was inadmissible as being protected because of clergy-penitent privilege.

At first, Simpson's defense sought to show that one or more hitmen hired by drug dealers had murdered Brown and Goldman – giving Brown a "Colombian necktie" – because they were looking for Brown's friend, Faye Resnick, a known cocaine user who had failed to pay for her drugs. She had stayed for several days at Brown's condo until entering rehab four days before the killings. Ito ruled that the drug killer theory was "highly speculative" with no evidence to support it. Consequently, Ito barred the jury from hearing it and prohibited Christian Reichardt from testifying about his former girlfriend Resnick's drug problems.

Rose Lopez, a neighbor's Spanish-speaking housekeeper, stated on August 18 that she saw Simpson's Bronco parked outside his house at the time of the murders, supporting his claim he was home that night. During cross-examination by Clark, Lopez admitted she was not sure what time she saw Simpson's Bronco but the defense still intended to call her. However, a taped July 29 statement by Lopez did not mention seeing the Bronco but did mention another housekeeper was also there that night, Sylvia Guerra. Prosecutors then spoke with Guerra, who said Lopez was lying and claimed the defense offered both housekeepers $5,000 to say they saw the Bronco that night. When Ito warned the defense that Guerra's claim as well as the earlier statement not mentioning the Bronco and the tape where Clark claims "that [Lopez] is clearly being coached on what to say" would be shown to the jury if Lopez testified, they dropped her from the witness list.

== Media coverage ==
When the trial began, all of the networks were getting these hate-mail letters because people's soap operas were being interrupted for the Simpson trial. But then what happened was the people who liked soap operas got addicted to the Simpson trial. And they got really upset when the Simpson trial was over, and people would come up to me on the street and say, 'God, I loved your show.'

— Marcia Clark, 2010

The murders and trial – "the biggest story I have ever seen", said a producer of NBC's Today – received extensive media coverage from the very beginning; at least one instant book was proposed two hours after the bodies were found, and scheduled to publish only a few weeks later. The case was a seminal event in the history of reality television, helping to revive the genre of court shows like Judge Judy. The Los Angeles Times covered the case on its front page for more than 300 days after the murders. The nightly news broadcasts from the Big Three television networks gave more airtime to the case than to the Bosnian War and the Oklahoma City bombing combined. They served an enthusiastic audience; one company put the loss of national productivity from employees following the case instead of working at $40 billion. The Tonight Show with Jay Leno aired many skits on the trial, and the Dancing Itos – a troupe of dancers dressed as the judge – was a popular recurring segment. According to Howard Kurtz of The Washington Post, the acquittal was "the most dramatic courtroom verdict in the history of Western civilization".

Participants in the case received much media coverage. Limo driver Park said the media offered him $100,000 but refused, as he would be removed as a witness. Fans approached Clark in public, and when she got a new hairstyle during the trial, the prosecutor received a standing ovation on the courthouse steps; People approved of the change, but advised her to wear "more fitted suits and tailored skirts". While Cochran, Bailey, and Dershowitz were already well-known, others like Kaelin became celebrities, and Paula Barbieri appeared in Playboy. Those involved in the trial followed their own media coverage. Interest in the case was worldwide; Russian president Boris Yeltsin's first question to President Clinton when they met in 1995 was, "Do you think O.J. did it?"

The issue of whether to allow any video cameras into the courtroom was among the first issues Judge Ito had to decide, ultimately ruling that live camera coverage was warranted. Ito was later criticized for this decision by other legal professionals. Dershowitz said that he believed that Ito, along with others related to the case such as Clark, Fuhrman and Kaelin, was influenced to some degree by the media presence and related publicity. The trial was covered in 2,237 news segments from 1994 through 1997. Ito was also criticized for allowing the trial to become a media circus and not doing enough to regulate the court proceedings.

Among the reporters who covered the trial daily from the courtroom, and a media-area that was dubbed "Camp O. J.", were Steve Futterman of CBS News, Linda Deutsch and Michael Fleeman of the Associated Press, Dan Whitcomb of Reuters, Janet Gilmore of the Los Angeles Daily News, Andrea Ford of the Los Angeles Times, Michelle Caruso of the New York Daily News, Dan Abrams of Court TV, Harvey Levin of KCBS, and David Margolick of The New York Times. Writers Dominick Dunne, Joe McGinniss, and Joseph Bosco also had full-time seats in the courtroom.

Simpson on the cover of Newsweek and Time. Time darkened the image, leading to controversy.

On June 27, 1994, Time published a cover story, "An American Tragedy", with a photo of Simpson on the cover. Time's cover image was darker than a typical magazine cover and darker than the original photo, as shown on a Newsweek cover released at the same time. Time consequently became the subject of a media scandal. Commentators found that its staff had used photo manipulation to darken the photo, and they speculated it was to make Simpson appear more menacing. After the publication of the photo drew widespread criticism of racist editorializing and yellow journalism, Time publicly apologized.

Charles Ogletree, a criminal defense attorney and law professor, said in a 2005 interview that the best investigative reporting regarding the murder and trial was by the National Enquirer.

== Trial ==
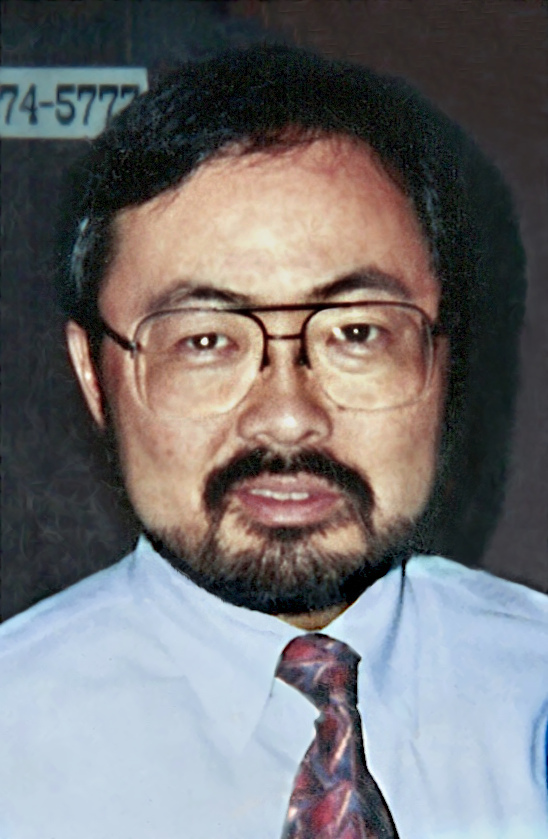
Judge Lance Ito presided over the trial

Simpson wanted a speedy trial, and the defense and prosecuting attorneys worked around the clock for several months to prepare their cases. The trial began on January 24, 1995, seven months after the murders, and was televised using a single remotely-operated camera by Court TV, and in part by other cable and network news outlets, for 134 days. Judge Lance Ito presided over the trial in the C.S. Foltz Criminal Courts Building (at the time known simply as the Criminal Courts Building).

=== Jury ===
District Attorney Gil Garcetti elected to file charges in downtown Los Angeles, as opposed to Santa Monica, in which jurisdiction the crimes took place. The Los Angeles Superior Court then decided to hold the trial in Downtown Los Angeles instead of Santa Monica due to safety issues at the Santa Monica Court house owing to the 1994 Northridge earthquake. The decision may have impacted the trial's outcome as it resulted in a jury pool that mainly consisted of African Americans. Richard Gabriel, a jury consultant, noted that African Americans at the time were far more likely than other minorities to be receptive to claims of racially motivated fraud by the police and were less likely to be familiar with and thus accept DNA evidence.

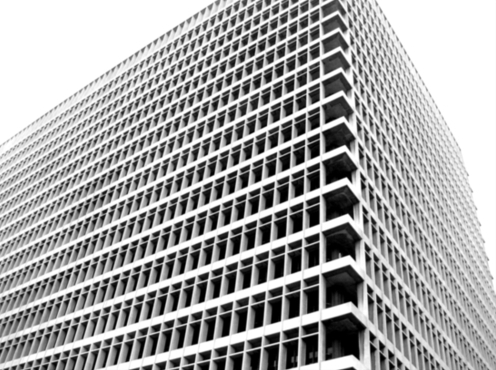
C.S. Foltz Criminal Courts Building

In October 1994, Judge Lance Ito started interviewing 304 prospective jurors, each of whom had to fill out a 75-page questionnaire. On November 3, twelve jurors were seated with twelve alternates. Over the course of the trial, ten were dismissed for a wide variety of reasons. Only five of the original jurors remained on the final panel.

According to media reports, Clark believed women, regardless of race, would sympathize with the domestic violence aspect of the case and connect with Brown personally. On the other hand, the defense's research suggested that black women would not be sympathetic to Brown, who was white, because of tensions about interracial marriages. Both sides accepted a disproportionate number of female jurors. From an original jury pool of 40 percent white, 28 percent black, 17 percent Hispanic, and 15 percent Asian, the final jury for the trial had ten women and two men, of whom nine were black, two white, and one Hispanic.

On April 5, 1995, juror Jeanette Harris was dismissed when Judge Ito learned she had failed to disclose an incident of domestic abuse. Afterwards, Harris gave an interview and accused the deputies of racism and claimed the jurors were dividing themselves along racial lines. Ito then met with the jurors, who all denied Harris's allegations of racial tension among themselves. The following day, Ito dismissed the three deputies anyway, which upset the jurors that did not complain because the dismissal appeared to lend credence to Harris's allegations, which they all denied. On April 21, thirteen of the eighteen jurors refused to come to court until they spoke with Ito about it. Ito then ordered them to court and the 13 protesters responded by wearing all black and refusing to come out to the jury box upon arrival. The media described this incident as a "Jury Revolt" and the protesters wearing all black as resembling a "funeral procession".

=== Prosecution case ===
The two lead prosecutors were Deputy District Attorneys Marcia Clark and William Hodgman, who was replaced as lead prosecutor by Christopher Darden. Clark was designated as the lead prosecutor and Darden became Clark's co-counsel. Prosecutors Hank Goldberg and Hodgman, who had successfully prosecuted high-profile cases in the past, assisted Clark and Darden. Two prosecutors who were DNA experts, Rockne Harmon and George "Woody" Clarke, were brought in to present the DNA evidence in the case and were assisted by Prosecutor Lisa Kahn.

==== Theory ====
The prosecution argued that the domestic violence within the Simpson-Brown marriage culminated in her murder. Simpson's history of abusing Brown resulted in their divorce and his pleading guilty to one count of domestic violence in 1989. On the night of the murders, Simpson attended a dance recital for his daughter and was reportedly angry with Brown because of a black dress that she wore, which he said was "tight". Simpson's then girlfriend, Paula Barbieri, wanted to attend the recital with Simpson but he did not invite her. After the recital, Simpson returned home to a voicemail from Barbieri ending their relationship.

According to the prosecution, Simpson then drove over to Brown's home in his Ford Bronco to reconcile their relationship as a result and when Brown refused, Simpson snapped and killed her in a "final act of control". Goldman then came upon the scene and was murdered in order to silence him and remove any witnesses. Afterwards, Simpson drove home in his Bronco, and he went into his house. There, he took off his bloodstained clothes, put them in the knapsack (except his socks and the glove), put clean ones on, and left towards the limousine. At the airport, Simpson opened the knapsack, removed the clothes, Bruno Magli shoes, and the murder weapon, and threw them in the trash, before putting the knapsack in one of his suitcases and heading towards his flight. After landing in Chicago, Simpson threw away the knapsack.

==== Domestic violence ====
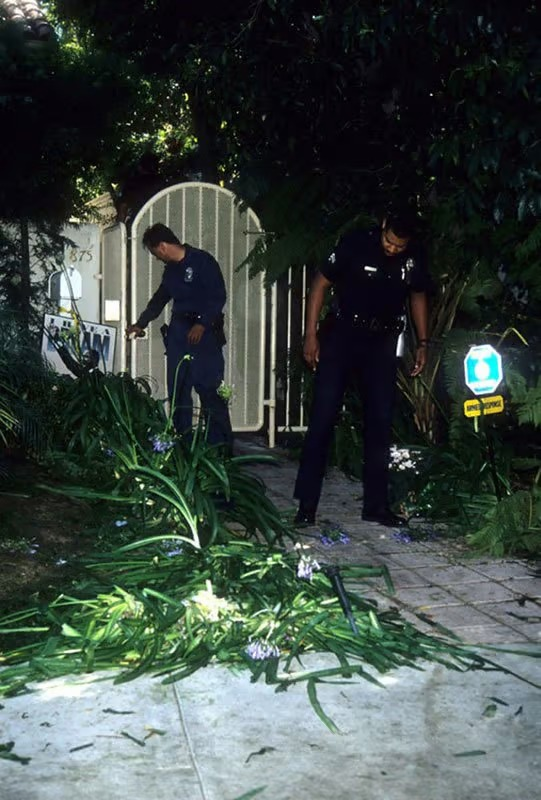
Police officers examining the crime scene

The prosecution opened its case by calling LAPD 911 dispatcher Sharon Gilbert and playing a 9-1-1 call from Brown on January 1, 1989, in which she expressed fear that Simpson would physically harm her; Simpson himself is even heard in the background yelling at her and possibly hitting her as well. The officer who responded to that call, Detective John Edwards, testified next that when he arrived, a severely beaten Brown ran from the bushes where she was hiding and to the detective screaming "He's going to kill me, he's going to kill me", referring to Simpson. Pictures of Brown's face from that night were then shown to the jury to confirm his testimony. That incident led to Simpson's arrest and eventual pleading of no contest to one count of domestic violence for which he received probation for one year.

LAPD officer and long time friend of both Simpson and Brown, Ron Shipp, testified on February 1, 1995, that Simpson told him the day after the murders that he did not want to take a polygraph test offered to him by the police, because "I've had a lot of dreams about killing her. I really don't know about taking that thing". The jury dismissed Shipp's claims after defense attorney Carl E. Douglas accused him of being an alcoholic, and testifying against Simpson to promote his acting career.

The prosecution then called Brown's sister, Denise Brown, to the witness stand. She testified to many episodes of domestic violence in the 1980s, when she saw Simpson physically abuse Brown and throw her out of their house during an argument. She said that Simpson was agitated with Brown on June 12. Although a home videotape taken immediately after the dance recital showed a cheerful Simpson being given a kiss by Denise Brown, Kato Kaelin corroborated the claim that Simpson was "upset" with Brown because of the black dress she wore, which he said was "tight".

The prosecution planned to present 62 separate incidents of domestic violence, including three previously unknown incidents Brown had documented in several letters she had written and placed in a bank safety deposit box. Judge Ito denied the defense's motion to suppress the incidents of domestic violence, but only allowed witnessed accounts to be presented to the jury because of Simpson's Sixth Amendment rights. Brown's statements to friends and family were ruled inadmissible as hearsay because Brown was dead and unable to be cross-examined. Despite this, the prosecution had witnesses for 44 separate incidents they planned to present to the jury.

However, the prosecution dropped the domestic violence portion of their case on June 20, 1995. Marcia Clark stated it was because they believed the DNA evidence against Simpson was insurmountable, but the media speculated it was because of the comments made by dismissed juror Jeanette Harris. Christopher Darden later confirmed that to be true. Harris was dismissed on April 6 because she failed to disclose that she was a victim of domestic violence from her ex-husband. Afterwards, she gave an interview in which she said the evidence of Simpson's abuse of Brown "doesn't mean he is guilty of murder". This dismissal of Simpson's abusive behavior from a female juror, who was also a victim of such abuse by her own husband, convinced the prosecution that the jury was not receptive to the domestic violence argument. After the verdict, the jurors called the domestic violence portion of the case a "waste of time". Shapiro, Dershowitz, and Uelmen later admitted they believe that race played a factor in the jurors' dismissal of Brown's abuse by Simpson.

The defense retained renowned advocate for victims of domestic abuse Lenore E. Walker. Cochran said that she would testify that Simpson does not fit the profile of an abuser that would murder his spouse. Walker's colleagues were appalled by her decision to defend Simpson and accused her of betraying her advocacy for a $250,000 retainer. Walker was dropped from the witness list for "tactical reasons" after she submitted her report on the case. In it, she opines that the statistic from Dershowitz that of the two million incidents of abuse per year, only 2,000 victims are actually murdered by their spouses as being misleading because Brown was already dead. The relevant statistic was "of the murdered spouses who were also victims of abuse, what percentage of them were murdered by their current or ex-husband?" When she reported that number was 80.3 percent, they dropped her from the witness list.

The revelation of Simpson's abuse of Brown is credited with turning public opinion against him. The public shock at the reason why Walker was dropped from the defense witness list is credited with transforming public opinion on spousal abuse from a private familial matter to a serious public health issue.

==== Timeline ====
Los Angeles County Chief Medical Examiner Lakshmanan Sathyavagiswaran testified on June 14, 1995, that Brown's time of death was estimated as between 10:00 pm and 10:30 pm. Kato Kaelin testified on March 22, 1995, that he last saw Simpson at 9:36 pm that evening. A phone call was made from Simpson's Bronco to Paula Barbieri at 10:02 pm. Simpson was not seen again until 10:54 pm when he answered the intercom at the front door for the limousine driver, Allan Park. Simpson had no alibi for approximately one hour and 18 minutes during which time the murders took place. Allan Park testified on March 28 that he arrived at Simpson's home at 10:25 pm and stopped at the Rockingham entrance; Simpson's Bronco was not there. He then drove over to the Ashford entrance and rang the intercom three times, getting no answer, starting at 10:40 pm. Then he saw someone arrive at Simpson's home through the front door, the lights then turned on and Simpson answered the intercom.

Park's testimony was significant because it explained the location of the glove found at Simpson's home. The blood trail from the Bronco to the front door was easily understood but the glove was found on the other side of the house. Park said the "shadowy figure" initially approached the front door before heading down the southern walkway which leads to where the glove was found by Fuhrman. The prosecution believed that Simpson had driven his Bronco to and from Brown's home to commit the murders, saw that Park was there and aborted his attempt to enter through the front door, entering through the back instead. He panicked and made the sounds that Kaelin heard when he realized that the security system would not let him enter through the rear entrance. He then discarded the glove, came back and went through the front door. During cross examination, Park conceded that he could not identify the figure but said he saw that person enter the front door and afterwards Simpson answered and said he was home alone. Park conceded that he did not notice any cuts on Simpson's left hand but added "I shook his right hand, not his left".

==== DNA evidence and blood trail ====
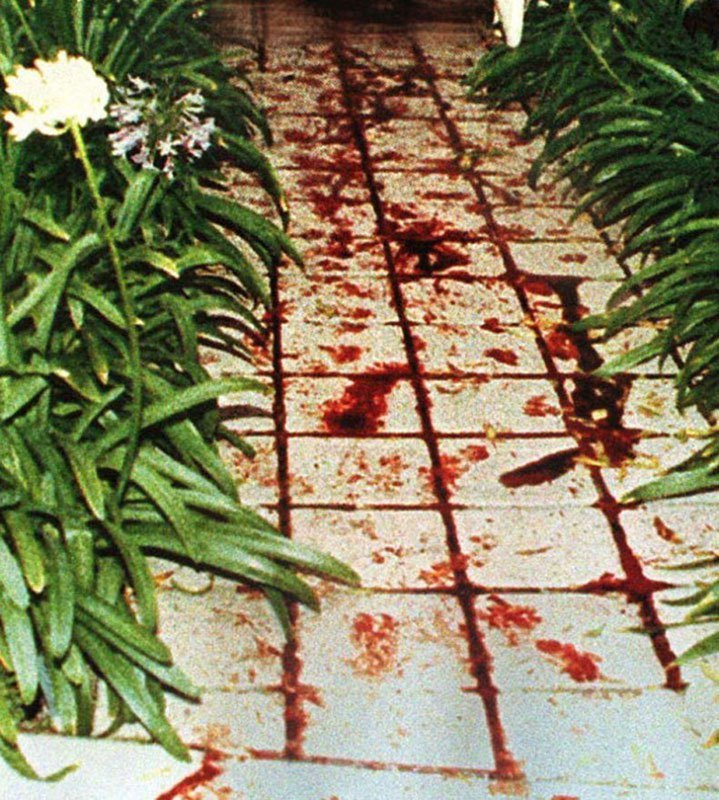
Crime scene photo at Brown's home.

The prosecution presented a total of 108 exhibits, including 61 drops of blood, of DNA evidence to link Simpson to the murders. With no witnesses to the crime, the prosecution was dependent on DNA as the only physical evidence linking Simpson to the crime. The volume of DNA evidence in this case was unique and the prosecution believed they could reconstruct how the crime was committed with enough accuracy to resemble an eyewitness account. Marcia Clark stated in her opening statements that there was a "trail of blood from the Bundy Crime scene through Simpson's Ford Bronco to his bedroom at Rockingham".

- Simpson's DNA found on blood drops next to the bloody footprints near the victims at the Bundy crime scene. The prosecution stated that the probability of error was 1-in-9.7 billion.
- Simpson's DNA found on a trail of blood drops leading away from the victims, towards and on the back gate at Bundy. The prosecution stated that the probability of error was 1-in-200.
- Simpson, Goldman, and Brown's DNA found on blood on the outside of the door and inside Simpson's Bronco. The prosecution stated that the probability of error was 1-in-21 billion.
- Simpson's DNA found on blood drops leading from the area where his Bronco was parked at Simpson's Rockingham home to the front door entrance.
- Simpson, Brown, and Goldman's DNA on a bloody glove found behind his home.
- Simpson and Brown's DNA found on blood on a pair of socks in Simpson's bedroom. The prosecution stated that the probability of error was 1-in-6.8 billion.

==== Hair and fiber evidence ====
LAPD criminalist and hair fiber expert Susan Brockbank testified on June 27, 1995, and FBI Special Agent and fiber expert Doug Deedrick testified on June 29, 1995, to the following findings:

- The fibers from the glove found at Simpson's home were microscopically similar to the one found at the crime scene.
- Both of the victims, the two gloves, and the blue knit cap worn by the killer had hair consistent with Simpson. The hair in the blue knit cap worn by the killer was embedded in the seams, indicating it was there from being worn repeatedly.
- Dark blue cotton clothing fibers were found on both victims. The video from the dance recital that Simpson attended earlier that night shows him wearing a similarly colored shirt. Kato Kaelin testified that Simpson was still wearing that shirt when they got home from McDonald's but not anymore when he answered the door for the limousine driver. The police searched his home but the shirt was never found.
- Hair consistent with Goldman was found on Brown and clothing fibers consistent with Brown was found on Goldman. This supported the prosecution's theory that the assailant killed Brown first, then Goldman, and afterwards returned to Brown to cut her throat. The hair consistent with Brown that was found on the Rockingham glove was torn which also supports the prosecution claim that the killer grabbed Brown by her hair to cut her throat.
- Fibers that were only used in the 1993-1994 model year Ford Bronco, the same car that Simpson owns, were found on both victims, the knit cap and on both gloves.
- The glove found at Simpson's home that belonged to the murderer had hair and clothing fibers consistent with Simpson, Brown and Goldman as well as fibers from a 1993–1994 Ford Bronco and Brown's Akita dog.

==== Shoeprint analysis ====
In June, FBI shoeprint expert William J. Bodziak testified that the bloody shoeprints found at the crime scene and inside Simpson's Bronco were made from a rare and expensive pair of Bruno Magli Italian shoes. He determined the shoes were a size 12, the same size that Simpson wore, and are only sold at Bloomingdale's. Only 299 pairs of that size were sold in the US and one of them was sold at the same store that Simpson often buys his shoes from. Bodziak also testified that, despite two sets of footprints at the crime scene, only one attacker was present because they were all made by the same shoes. During cross-examination Bailey suggested the murderer deliberately wore shoes that were the wrong size, which Bodziak dismissed as "ridiculous".

Simpson denied ever owning a pair of the shoes; there was only circumstantial evidence he did. Bloomingdale's employee Samuel Poser testified he remembered showing Simpson those shoes, but there was no store record of him purchasing them. Although the prosecution could not prove that Simpson owned a pair of those shoes, Bodziak testified that a similar bloody shoeprint was left on the floor inside Simpson's Bronco. Scheck suggested that Fuhrman broke into the Bronco and left the footprint there; he produced a photo of Fuhrman walking through a puddle of blood. Bodziak admitted that he was not able to confirm that the shoeprint in the car definitely came from a Bruno Magli shoe, but dismissed Scheck's claim because none of the shoeprints at the crime scene were made by Fuhrman's shoes, making it unlikely he could have made a bloody shoeprint in the Bronco.

=== Defense case ===
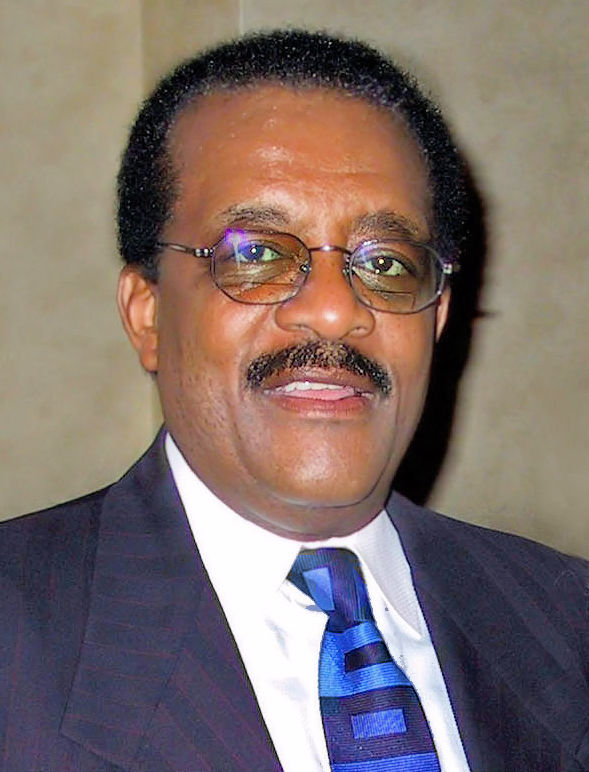
Johnnie Cochran

Simpson hired a team of high-profile defense lawyers, initially led by Robert Shapiro, who was previously a civil lawyer known for settling, and then subsequently by Johnnie Cochran, who at that point was known for police brutality and civil rights cases. The team included noted defense attorney F. Lee Bailey, Robert Kardashian, Harvard appeals lawyer Alan Dershowitz, his student Robert Blasier, and Dean of Santa Clara University School of Law Gerald Uelmen. Assisting Cochran were Carl E. Douglas and Shawn Holley. Barry Scheck and Peter Neufeld were also hired; they headed the Innocence Project and specialized in DNA evidence. Simpson's defense was said to have cost between US$3–6 million; the media dubbed the talented attorneys the Dream Team, while the taxpayer cost of prosecution was over US$9 million.

==== Postulate ====
The defense team's reasonable doubt angle was summarized as "contaminated, compromised, and ultimately corrupted" in opening statements. They argued the DNA evidence against Simpson was compromised by mishandling by Dennis Fung and Andrea Mazzola during the collection phase of evidence gathering, and that 100% of the DNA of the real killer(s) had vanished from the evidence samples. The defense argued that evidence was then contaminated in the LAPD crime lab by criminalist Collin Yamauchi and that Simpson's DNA from his reference vial was transferred to all but three exhibits. The remaining three exhibits were planted by the police and thus corrupted by police fraud. The defense also questioned the timeline, claiming the murders happened around 11:00 pm that night, when Simpson had an alibi.

==== Timeline ====
The physician Robert Huizenga testified in July 1995 that Simpson was not physically capable of carrying out the murders due to chronic arthritis and old football injuries. During cross-examination, the prosecution produced an exercise video that Simpson had made a few weeks before the murders titled O.J. Simpson Minimum Maintenance: Fitness for Men, which demonstrated that Simpson was anything but frail. Huizenga admitted afterwards that Simpson could have committed the murders if he was in "the throes of an adrenaline-rush".

Michael Baden, a forensic pathologist, testified that the murders happened closer to 11:00 pm. He stated that Brown was still conscious, standing, and took a step after her throat was cut and that after Goldman's jugular vein was lacerated he continued to stand and fight his assailant for ten minutes.

After the trial, Baden admitted his claim of Goldman's long struggle was inaccurate and that testifying for Simpson was a mistake. Critics claimed that Baden knowingly gave false testimony in order to collect a $100,000 retainer because the week before he testified, John Gerdes admitted that Goldman's blood was found in Simpson's Bronco despite Goldman never having an opportunity within his lifetime to be in the Bronco.

Nicole's mother, Juditha, told police and investigators in a sworn statement that she was speaking with her daughter on the telephone at 11:00pm that evening. Those phone records were sealed. A vat of ice cream was still partially frozen sitting on the downstairs bannister when police searched the open-door house around 12:30am on June 13. The local weather was reported to be around 60 °F (16 °C) that night, implying that by that time, the ice cream should have been near-completely thawed.

==== Compromised and contaminated ====
Barry Scheck and Peter Neufeld argued that the results from the DNA testing were not reliable because the police were "sloppy" in collecting and preserving it from the crime scene. Fung and Mazzola did admit to making several mistakes during evidence collection, which included not always changing gloves between handling evidence items, packaging and storing the evidence items using plastic bags rather than paper bags as recommended, and storing evidence in the police van, which was not refrigerated, for up to seven hours after collection. This, the defense argued, would allow bacteria to degrade the DNA and thus make the samples more susceptible to cross-contamination in the LAPD crime lab.

The prosecution denied that the mistakes made by Fung and Mazzola changed the validity of the results. They noted that all of the evidence samples were testable and that most of the DNA testing was done at the two consulting labs, not the LAPD crime lab where contamination supposedly happened. Since all of the samples the consulting labs received were testable, while Scheck and Neufeld's theory predicted that they should have been inconclusive after being "100% degraded", the claim that all the DNA was lost to bacterial degradation was not credible. The prosecution also denied that contamination happened in the LAPD crime lab because the result would have been a mixture of Simpson's DNA and the DNA of the "real killer(s)", but the results showed that only Simpson's DNA was present. The prosecution also noted the defense declined to challenge any of those results by testing the evidence themselves. Marcia Clark called Scheck and Neufeld's claims a "smoke-screen".

The contamination claim was made by microbiologist John Gerdes. He testified in August 1995 that Forensic PCR DNA matching is not reliable and that the LAPD crime lab has a "chronic", "substantial contamination problem". Gerdes testified that because of the LAPD's past history of contamination, he would not consider any of the PCR DNA matches in this case reliable. He also claimed that the consulting labs' PCR DNA matches were not reliable, as the evidence they tested went "through the LAPD" for packaging and shipping. Gerdes believed only three of the DNA matches to have been valid, which were the same three the defense alleged were planted by the police.

During cross-examination, Gerdes admitted there was no evidence that cross-contamination had occurred and that he was only testifying to "what might occur and not what actually did occur". He accepted that the victims' blood was in the Bronco and Simpson's blood was at the crime scene and neither was due to contamination. He also conceded that nothing happened during "packaging and shipping" that would affect the validity of the results at the two consulting labs. The prosecution implied that Gerdes was not a credible witness: he had no forensic experience, had only testified for criminal defendants in the past, and always said the DNA evidence against them was not reliable due to contamination. Clark also implied that it was not a coincidence that the three evidence items he initially said were valid were the same three the defense claimed were planted while the other 58 were all false positives and the 47 substrate controls, which are used to determine if contamination occurred, were all false negatives. Defense forensic DNA expert Henry Lee, testifying in August 1995, admitted that Gerdes's claim was "highly improbable".

Barry Scheck's eight-day cross-examination of Dennis Fung was lauded in the media. However, Howard Coleman, president of Seattle-based forensic DNA laboratory GeneLex, criticized Scheck's cross-examination as "smoke and mirrors", stating: "Everything we get in the lab is contaminated to some degree. What contamination and degradation will lead you to is an inconclusive result. It doesn't lead you to a false positive".

==== Police conspiracy allegation ====
The defense initially only claimed that three exhibits were planted by the police but eventually argued that virtually all of the blood evidence against Simpson was planted in a police conspiracy. They accused prison nurse Thano Peratis, criminalists Dennis Fung, Andrea Mazzola, and Colin Yamauchi, and Vannatter and Fuhrman, of participating in a plot to frame Simpson. In closing arguments, Cochran called Fuhrman and Vannatter "twins of deception", Vannatter "the man who carried the blood" and Fuhrman "the man who found the glove".

==== EDTA ====
The only physical evidence offered by the defense that the police tried to frame Simpson was the allegation that two of the 108 DNA evidence samples tested in the case contained the preservative ethylenediaminetetraacetic acid (EDTA). However, it was the prosecution who asked to have the samples tested for the preservative, not the defense. The defense alleged that the drop of blood on the back gate at the Bundy crime scene, which matched Simpson, and the blood found on a pair of socks in Simpson's bedroom, which matched Brown, were planted by the police. In order to support this claim, the defense pointed to the presence in the blood samples of EDTA, a preservative found in the purple-topped collection tubes used for police reference vials. In July 1995, Fredric Rieders, a forensic toxicologist who had analysed the FBI's results, testified that the level of EDTA in the evidence samples was higher than that which is normally found in blood: this appeared to support the defense's claim that the blood came from the reference vials. During cross-examination, Clark asked Rieders to read out loud the portion of the EPA article that stated what the normal levels of EDTA in blood are, which he had referenced during his testimony. This demonstrated that he had misread the article and that the levels found in the evidence samples were consistent with those found in blood that was not preserved in a police reference vial. Rieders then claimed it was a "typo", but the prosecution produced a direct copy from the EPA confirming the normal amounts of EDTA found in unpreserved blood. The prosecution also had Rieders admit that EDTA is found in food and specifically the ingredients used in the McDonald's Big Mac and french fries that Simpson had eaten earlier that night.

FBI special agent Roger Martz was called by the defense in July 1995 to testify that EDTA was present in the evidence samples. Instead, he said he did not identify it in the blood, contradicting Rieders' testimony. Initially he conceded the blood samples were "consistent with the presence of EDTA", but he later clarified his response after hearing that "everyone is saying that I found EDTA", which he denied. The defense accused him of changing his demeanor to favor the prosecution, and he replied: "I cannot be entirely truthful by only giving 'yes' and 'no' answers". Martz stated that it was impossible to ascertain with certainty the presence of EDTA, as while the presumptive test for it was positive, the identification test for it was inconclusive. He also tested his own unpreserved blood and got the same results for EDTA levels as the evidence samples, which he said conclusively disproved the claim that the evidence blood came from the reference vials. He contended that the defense had jumped to conclusions from the presumptive test results, while his tests had in fact shown that "those bloodstains did not come from preserved blood".

==== Back gate ====
The defense alleged that Simpson's blood on the back gate at the Bundy crime scene was planted by the police. The blood on the back gate was collected on July 3, 1994, rather than June 13. The volume of DNA in that blood was significantly higher than the other blood evidence collected on June 13. The volume of DNA was so high that the defense conceded that it could not be explained by contamination in the lab. However, they noted that it was unusual for that blood to have more DNA in it than the other samples collected at the crime scene, especially since it had been left exposed to the elements for several weeks and was collected after the crime scene had supposedly been washed over. In March 1995, Vannatter testified that he instructed Fung to collect the blood on the gate on June 13 and Fung admitted he had not done so. The defense suggested the reason why Fung did not collect the blood is because it was not there that day; when shown a blown-up photograph taken of the back gate on June 13, he admitted he could not see the blood.

The prosecution responded that a different photograph showed the blood was present on the back gate on June 13, before any blood had been taken from Simpson's arm. Robert Riske was the first officer at the crime scene and the one who pointed out the blood on the back gate to Fuhrman, who documented it in his notes that night. Multiple other officers testified that the blood was present on the back gate the night of the murders. The prosecution also pointed out that the media cameras present proved that Vannatter never returned to the crime scene (Brown's home) that evening, where Simpson's blood was allegedly planted.

==== Bronco ====
Barry Scheck alleged the police had twice planted the victims' blood inside Simpson's Bronco. An initial collection was made on June 13; the defense accused Vannatter of planting the victims' blood in the Bronco when he returned to Simpson's home later that evening. The prosecution responded that the Bronco had already been impounded by the time Vannatter returned and was not even at Rockingham.

==== Socks ====
The defense alleged that the police had planted Brown's blood on the socks found in Simpson's bedroom. The socks were collected on June 13 and had blood from both Simpson and Brown, but her blood on the socks was not identified until August 4. The socks were found by Fuhrman, but the defense suggested Vannatter planted the blood. He had received both blood reference vials from the victims earlier that day from the coroner and booked them immediately into evidence. Vannatter then drove back to Rockingham later that evening to hand-deliver the reference vial for Simpson to Fung, which the defense alleged gave him opportunity to plant the blood. Fung testified he could not see blood on the socks he collected from Simpson's bedroom, and the prosecution later demonstrated that those blood stains were only visible underneath a microscope.

Vannatter denied planting Brown's blood on the socks. The video from Willie Ford indicated that the socks had already been collected and stored in the evidence van before Vannatter arrived and footage from the media cameras present appeared to prove that he never went inside the evidence van after he arrived at Rockingham.

==== Glove ====
The last exhibit allegedly planted was the bloody glove found at Simpson's property by Fuhrman. Unlike the sock and the back gate, the defense provided no physical or eyewitness evidence to support their claim that the prosecution could then refute. The New Yorker published an article months before the trial began which cited a source in Simpson's defense team as saying that they intended to accuse Fuhrman of planting the glove, with the motive being racism. Robert Shapiro later admitted he was the magazine's source.

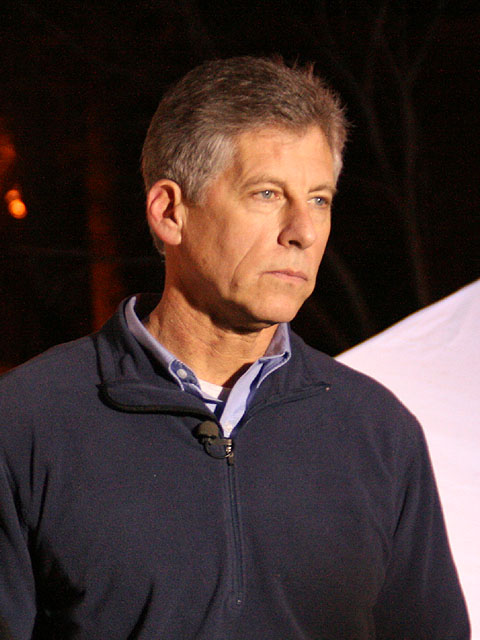
Mark Fuhrman

Defense attorney F. Lee Bailey suggested that Fuhrman found the glove at the crime scene, picked it up with a stick, placed it in a plastic bag, and concealed it in his sock when he drove to Simpson's home with Lange, Vannatter, and Phillips. Bailey suggested that Fuhrman then planted the glove to frame Simpson, with the motive being either racism or a desire to become the hero in a high-profile case. Scheck suggested that Fuhrman broke into the Bronco and used the glove to plant blood onto and inside the Bronco.

The prosecution denied that Fuhrman planted the glove. They noted that several officers had already combed over the crime scene for almost two hours before Fuhrman arrived and none had noticed a second glove. Lange testified that 14 other officers were there when Fuhrman arrived and all said there was only one glove at the scene. Lt. Frank Spangler also testified that he was with Fuhrman for the duration of his time there, saying he would have seen Fuhrman steal the glove. Clark added that Fuhrman did not know whether Simpson had an alibi, if there were any witnesses to the murders, whose blood was on the glove, that the Bronco belonged to Simpson, or whether Kaelin had already searched the area where the glove was found.

During cross-examination by Bailey, Fuhrman denied that he had used the word "nigger" to describe African Americans in the ten years prior to his testimony. A few months later, the defense presented audiotapes of Fuhrman repeatedly using the word eight years before the murders. The Fuhrman tapes became the cornerstone of the defense's case that his testimony lacked credibility. Clark called the tapes "the biggest red herring" ever.

After screenwriter Laura Hart McKinny handed over the tapes to the defense, Fuhrman says he asked the prosecution for a redirect to explain the context of those tapes but the prosecution and fellow officers abandoned him after Ito played the audiotapes in open court. The public reaction was explosive, comparable to the reaction to the video of the King beating. After the trial, Fuhrman said that he was not a racist and apologized for his language, claiming he was play-acting for a screenplay when he made the tapes and had been asked to be as dramatic as possible. Many of his minority former coworkers expressed support for him.

On September 6, 1995, Fuhrman was called back to the stand by the defense after the prosecution refused to redirect him. The jury was absent but the exchange was televised. Fuhrman, facing a possible prosecution for perjury, was instructed by his attorney to invoke the Fifth Amendment to avoid self-incrimination to two consecutive questions he was asked. Defense attorney Uelmen asked Fuhrman if it was his intention to plead the Fifth to all questions, and Fuhrman's attorney instructed him to reply "yes". Uelmen spoke with other members of the defense and then said he had just one more question: "Did you plant or manufacture any evidence in this case?" Following his attorney's instruction, Fuhrman again invoked the Fifth.

Cochran responded to Fuhrman's pleading the Fifth by accusing the other officers of conspiring to protect Fuhrman; he asked Judge Ito to suppress all of the evidence that Fuhrman found. Ito denied the request, stating that pleading the Fifth does not imply guilt and that there was no evidence of fraud. Cochran asked that the jury be allowed to hear Fuhrman taking the Fifth, and again Ito denied his request. Ito criticized the defense's theory of how Fuhrman allegedly planted the glove, stating it was illogical.

Simpson trying on the gloves, June 15, 1995

On June 15, 1995, Darden surprised Clark by asking Simpson to try on the gloves found at the crime scene and his home. The prosecution had earlier decided against asking Simpson to try them on because the gloves had been soaked in blood from Simpson, Brown, and Goldman, and frozen and unfrozen several times. Instead they presented a witness who testified that Brown had purchased a pair of those gloves in the same size in 1990 at Bloomingdale's for Simpson, along with a receipt and a photo of Simpson earlier wearing the same type of gloves.

The leather gloves appeared too tight for Simpson to put on easily, especially over the latex gloves he wore underneath. Clark claimed that Simpson was acting when he appeared to be struggling to put on the gloves. Cochran replied, "I don't think he could act the size of his hands". Darden then told Ito of his concerns that Simpson "has arthritis and we looked at the medication he takes and some of it is anti-inflammatory and we are told he has not taken the stuff for a day and it caused swelling in the joints and inflammation in his hands". Cochran informed Ito the next day that Shawn Chapman contacted the Los Angeles County Jail doctor, who confirmed Simpson was taking his arthritis medication every day, and that the jail's medical records verified this.

In a June 28, 1995, memo to Cochran, Uelmen came up with—and Cochran later repeated—a quip he used in his closing arguments: "If it doesn't fit, you must acquit". In his memo to Cochran, Uelmen noted that the phrase not only applied to the gloves but to the evidence presented by the prosecutors:

What the memo really tries to do is play off the jury instructions... I thought that instruction on circumstantial evidence [CALJIC 2.01] was just incredibly good for us, so when we knew that instruction was going to be given, it just popped out at me. It says if it doesn't fit, you must acquit. What I was trying to do is not just remind the jury of that moment in the trial of trying on the glove, but the whole concept of did the evidence really fit the story that the prosecution was trying to present.

The prosecution stated they believed the gloves shrank from having been soaked in the blood of the victims. This model of gloves was made out of leather, which, as confirmed by Richard Rubin, can shrink up to 15% after being exposed to moisture and can never return to its original size. Darden produced a new pair of the same type of gloves, which fit Simpson when he tried them on. Rubin was a former vice president of Aris Isotoner Inc., which makes the gloves in question. On September 12, 1995, Rubin testified he was "100 certain" that the gloves at the murder scene—and also the style of gloves which Simpson was seen wearing in photographs and football broadcasts between 1990 and 1994—were of the company's rare Aris Light model and that they appeared to have shrunk. Rubin also noted that another pair of similar gloves which Simpson could be seen wearing during a football broadcast were noticeably absorbing rain water.

After the trial, Cochran revealed that Bailey had goaded Darden into asking Simpson to try on the gloves and that Shapiro had told Simpson in advance that they would not fit.

=== Summation ===
In closing arguments, Darden ridiculed the notion that police officers might have wanted to frame Simpson. He questioned why, if the LAPD was against Simpson, they went to his house eight times on domestic violence calls against Brown between 1986 and 1988 but did not arrest him; they only arrested him on charges of abuse in January 1989. Darden noted the police did not arrest Simpson for five days after the 1994 murders. During the prosecution's closing argument, Cochran and Scheck objected seventy-one times; Ito overruled sixty-nine of them.

During his closing argument, Cochran pointed out the many flaws of the LAPD, particularly Fuhrman, Lange, and Vannatter. He emphasized that Fuhrman was proved to have repeatedly referred to black people as "niggers" and also to have boasted of beating young black men in his role as a police officer. Cochran compared Fuhrman to Adolf Hitler and referred to him as "the personification of evil", and claimed that Fuhrman had planted the glove in an attempt to frame Simpson for the murders, based on his dislike of interracial couples. Cochran also presented a piece of paper named "Vannatter's Big Lies", claiming Vannatter had returned to the crime scene with Simpson's blood to plant it there, despite Vannatter having previously testified that he had given it to Dennis Fung in order to avoid the exhibits from getting mixed up. Cochran referred to Fuhrman and Vannatter as the "two devils of deception", and implored the jurors to "stop this cover-up" and "acquit Simpson and send the police a message", which was interpreted by many as an appeal for a jury nullification.

Following his summation, Cochran received numerous death threats, and hired bodyguards from Louis Farrakhan. In response, Fred Goldman, who was himself Jewish, referred to Cochran himself as a racist and a "sick man" for comparing Fuhrman to Hitler while associating himself with Farrakhan, who was widely considered a black supremacist and anti-Semite. Robert Shapiro, also Jewish, said he was offended by Cochran comparing Fuhrman's claims to the Holocaust. In an interview regarding Vincent Bugliosi's analysis on the case, Vannatter claimed that he was so infuriated at Cochran's claims about him that he felt a desire to strangle him in the courtroom.

=== Verdict ===
Fears grew that race riots, similar to the riots in 1992, would erupt across Los Angeles and the rest of the country if Simpson were convicted of the murders. As a result, all Los Angeles police officers were put on 12-hour shifts. The police arranged for more than 100 police officers on horseback to surround the Los Angeles County courthouse on the day the verdict was announced, in case of rioting by the crowd. President Bill Clinton was briefed on security measures if rioting were to occur nationwide.

The only testimony that the jury reviewed was that of limo driver Park. At 10:07 a.m. on October 3, 1995, Simpson was acquitted on both counts of murder. The jury arrived at the verdict by 3:00 pm on October 2, after four hours of deliberation, but it postponed the announcement. After the verdict was read, juror number nine, 44-year-old Lionel Cryer, gave Simpson a Black Power raised fist salute. The New York Times reported that Cryer was a former member of the revolutionary nationalist Black Panther Party that prosecutors had "inexplicably left on the panel".

An estimated 100 million people worldwide watched or listened to the verdict's announcement. Long-distance telephone call volume declined by 58 percent, and trading volume on the New York Stock Exchange decreased by 41 percent. Water usage decreased as people avoided using bathrooms. So much work stopped that the verdict resulted in an estimated $480 million in lost production. The US Supreme Court received a message on the verdict during oral arguments, with the justices quietly passing the note to each other while listening to the attorney's presentation. Congressmen canceled press conferences, with Joe Lieberman telling reporters, "Not only would you not be here, but I wouldn't be here, either".

=== Acquittal and aftermath ===
African-American LAPD Police Chief Willie Williams indicated that he had no plans to reopen the investigation, saying of the acquittals, "It doesn't mean there's another murderer". The LAPD has also declined to reexamine the evidence with modern methods in recent years because Simpson could not be tried for the same crime again under the Fifth Amendment.

==== Fate of the Broncos ====
Simpson's 1993 Ford Bronco was never returned to him and was destroyed by the LAPD shortly after the trial ended.

Cowlings's 1993 Ford Bronco from the low-speed chase was purchased in 1994 by Simpson's former sports agent Mike Gilbert and two other men. It then ended up being mostly in a parking garage for the next 17 years (1995–2012) and being only rarely used. As of 2017, the vehicle was on loan to the Alcatraz East Crime Museum, where it was put on display as part of an exhibit on the murder trial.

==== Legislative changes ====
The strong public reaction to Brown's letters and statements describing her abuse spurred passage of the Violence Against Women Act in 1994, which Clark and Douglas referred to as the "O.J. rule". After the trial, researchers reported increased reporting, arrests, and harsher sentences for those convicted of domestic violence.

==== Analysis of polling data ====
After the verdict, polling showed that 75 percent of White Americans thought Simpson was guilty while 70 percent of Black Americans thought he was innocent. An NBC poll taken in 2004 reported 87 percent of Whites believed Simpson was guilty, compared to only 27 percent of Black respondents. In the 2010s, polling showed the gap had narrowed, with a majority of both now believing he was guilty: 83 percent of White and 57 percent of Black Americans.

==== Political impact and civil rights ====
Scholarly consensus is that the trial damaged race relations in America and point to polling which shows that belief in Simpson's guilt depended on the race of the individual and not on the evidence against him. Analysis of the "racial gap" in polling shows that it did not cross the political spectrum. Conservatives regardless of race or gender thought Simpson was guilty. Where the gap emerged was among liberals – with black liberals believing Simpson was innocent, while white liberals thought he was guilty. Stanford University Law Professor Richard Thompson Ford wrote that this made the verdict a wedge issue that divided liberals along racial lines as white liberals felt the verdict was a racially motivated jury nullification and resented the images of African Americans celebrating the verdict. Led by Ward Connerly, opponents of affirmative action, seized upon the division and rebranded as advocating race neutrality, which appealed to white liberals now due to their perceived unjustness of the verdict and in 1996 voters in California passed Proposition 209, which ended affirmative action programs in the state. A historic drop in diversity at the University of California system followed which resulted in a similar drop in diversity that still remains in the state's white-collar job market, especially in the high-tech hub of Silicon Valley. A further initiative rejected by voters, Proposition 54 in 2003, would have further increased the impact of Prop 209 by abolishing racial classifications so the drop in diversity couldn't be quantified. The murder of George Floyd revived empathy for racial injustice among white liberals but the unsuccessful attempt to repeal Proposition 209 in 2020 was credited to the trial's legacy of undermining race relations.

Polling shows that racial and ethnic minority groups were divided by the verdict as well. Latinos and African Americans both believed that fraud was taking place in the LAPD but disagreed on the cause. Simpson said he felt vindicated by the Rampart Scandal which proved that fraud was happening in the C.R.A.S.H anti-gang unit. However, this fraud was not racially motivated: all the officers involved were minorities themselves and were actually found to be affiliated with one of the gangs they were supposed to be policing.

Comparisons were made years later between the Trayvon Martin case and the O.J. Simpson case, and how race impacted both. During an interview with Piers Morgan, when asked if there was a similarity in the racial aspects of the cases, Ron Goldman’s sister Kim said all of the evidence pointed towards guilt in Simpson’s case, while she believed George Zimmerman’s not guilty verdict was correct because it was a self defense case and that the killing of Trayvon Martin was not racially charged. Fred Goldman also denied racism played a factor in the killing of Trayvon or the outcome of the Simpson trial in an interview.

==== Publications ====
Several jurors together published Madame Foreman in 1995 to respond to allegations the verdict was racially motivated. They concluded that Simpson probably was guilty but the prosecution failed to prove it beyond a reasonable doubt.

In 1996, Cochran published Journey to Justice, in which he denied playing the "race card" and maintained that the LAPD tried to frame Simpson.

Shapiro published The Search for Justice in 1996 about the case. He concluded that the not guilty verdict was correct due to reasonable doubt, but criticized Bailey and Cochran for bringing race into the trial. In comparison to Cochran's book, he wrote: "I never believed that Simpson was being victimized by a racist police organization because he was black...or that he was seen as a black hero".

In 1998, Clark published Without a Doubt, in which she opined that the acquittal demonstrated the legal system is still compromised by race and celebrity because the prosecution's physical evidence should have easily convicted Simpson.

Darden published In Contempt in 1998 about the trial. He attributed the acquittal to poor stewardship by a "starstruck" Judge Ito and a "dysfunctional and uneducated" jury.

Vincent Bugliosi published Outrage: The Five Reasons why O. J. Simpson Got Away with Murder in 1997. Bugliosi blamed the verdict on an incompetent jury, prosecution, and judge. He wrote: "Other than when a killer is apprehended in the act, I have never seen a more obvious case of guilt. All of the evidence—not some or most of it—points irresistibly to Simpson's guilt and his guilt alone".

Henry Lee published Blood Evidence: How DNA Is Revolutionizing The Way We Solve Crimes in 2003, in which he noted that both the defense's forensic DNA experts had rejected Scheck's contamination claim.

Fuhrman published Murder in Brentwood in 1998, defending himself against fraud claims. He wrote that his taking the Fifth was to avoid prosecution for perjury.

In 1997, Tom Lange and Philip Vannatter published Evidence Dismissed: The Inside Story of the Police Investigation of O.J. Simpson, in which they defended themselves against allegations of corruption and incompetence.

Daniel M. Petrocelli published Triumph of Justice: The Final Judgement of the Simpson Saga in 1998, comparing the criminal and civil trials. He attributed the acquittal to bad rulings by Judge Ito, unethical behavior by the defense, and unreliable testimony from Gerdes, Rieders, Lee, and Baden.

In 1999, sociologist Darnell Hunt published O.J. Simpson Facts and Fictions: News Rituals in the Construction of Reality. Hunt argued that the racial gap in polling was a manufactured product of selective reporting of facts by the media due to their treatment of the trial as a form of entertainment rather than a legal proceeding.

===== If I Did It =====
In 2006, ReganBooks announced a book ghostwritten by Pablo Fenjves based on interviews with Simpson titled If I Did It, an account which the publisher said was a hypothetical confession. The book's release was planned to coincide with a Fox interview featuring Simpson. The project was cancelled due to public criticism. Later, the Goldman family was awarded the rights to the book and published it under the title If I Did It: Confessions of the Killer. In 2018, Fox broadcast Simpson's previously unaired interview in a special titled O.J. Simpson: The Lost Confession? The interview was widely interpreted as being a form of implied confession because Simpson used first person language ("Obviously I must have [removed the glove]") in explaining how he would have committed the murders.

==== Post-trial interviews ====
In an interview with Barbara Walters, Shapiro said he was offended by Cochran comparing Fuhrman to Adolf Hitler, and said he would never work with Bailey or Cochran again. He also said the defense played the "race card". Robert Kardashian admitted that, prior to the jurors visiting Simpson's home, the defense team had switched out his photos of white women for photos of his children and switched out a picture of a nude Paula Barbieri (Simpson's white then-girlfriend) for a Norman Rockwell painting from Cochran's office.

Simpson gave two high-profile interviews regarding the case – in 1996 with Ross Becker and in 2004 with Katie Couric. In the February 1998 issue of Esquire, Simpson was quoted as saying, "Let's say I committed this crime ...even if I did this, it would have to have been because I loved her very much, right?" In 1998, during an interview with Ruby Wax, Simpson pretended to stab her with a banana in an apparent joke. In 2008, Mike Gilbert released his book How I Helped O.J. Get Away with Murder, which quotes Simpson allegedly saying: "If she hadn't opened that door with a knife in her hand ... she'd still be alive."

In the documentary O.J.: Made in America, juror Carrie Bess said she believed "90% of the jury actually decided to acquit Simpson as payback for Rodney King". Juror Lionel Cryer, who notably gave Simpson a Black Power salute, stated in 2017 that in retrospect he would render a guilty verdict. Juror Anise Aschenbach, who initially voted guilty before changing her vote, stated in 2008 that she regrets the decision and believes Simpson is guilty because he is not looking for the "real killer" like he promised he would.

"On the evidence that they gave me to evaluate, it was crooked by the cops", juror David Aldana said in an interview. "The evidence given to me to look at, I could not convict. Did he do it? Maybe, maybe not." Juror Sheila Woods denied the jury's decision was based on race in an interview with Vulture. When asked if she believed Simpson was framed, Woods stated, "I don't know if he was necessarily framed. I think O.J. may know something about what happened, but I just don't think he did it. I think it was more than one person, just because of the way she was killed. I don't know how he could have just left that bloody scene — because it was bloody — and got back into his Bronco and not have it filled with blood. And then go back home and go in the front door, up the stairs to his bedroom ... That carpet was snow white in his house. He should have blood all over him or bruises because Ron Goldman was definitely fighting for his life. He had defensive cuts on his shoes and on his hands. O.J. only had that little cut on his finger. If Goldman was kicking to death, you would think that the killer would have gotten some bruises on his body. They showed us photos of O.J. with just his underwear just two days after, and he had no bruises or anything on his body." In an interview with CNN following Simpson's death, juror Yolanda Adams said she was still comfortable with her decision to render a not guilty verdict and denied the verdict was based on payback for Rodney King, citing the reasonable doubt in the case presented by the defense and the actions of the police officers involved in the case like Mark Fuhrman pleading the fifth when he was asked if he planted or manufactured any evidence against Simpson.

In 2018, Fox aired an interview Simpson gave in 2006 with publisher Judith Regan, titled O.J. Simpson: The Lost Confession?, where he gave "hypothetical" details about his role in the murders.

==== Civil trial ====
Rufo vs. Simpson
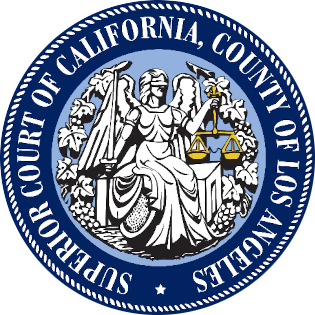
- Seal of the Court
- Court: Superior Court of California, County of Los Angeles
- Decided: February 5, 1997
- Verdict: Simpson liable for the wrongful death of and battery against Goldman, and battery against Brown
- Citation: SCO31947

Court membership
- Judge sitting: Hiroshi Fujisaki

In 1996, Fred Goldman and Sharon Rufo, the parents of Ron Goldman, and Lou Brown, father of Nicole Brown filed a civil suit against Simpson for wrongful death. The plaintiffs were represented by Daniel Petrocelli and Simpson by Robert Baker. Presiding Judge Hiroshi Fujisaki did not allow the trial to be televised, did not sequester the jury, and prohibited the defense from alleging racism by the LAPD and from condemning the crime lab. The physical evidence did not change but additional evidence of domestic violence was presented as well as 31 pre-1994 photos of Simpson wearing Bruno Magli shoes, including one that was published 6 months before the murders, proving it could not be a forgery.

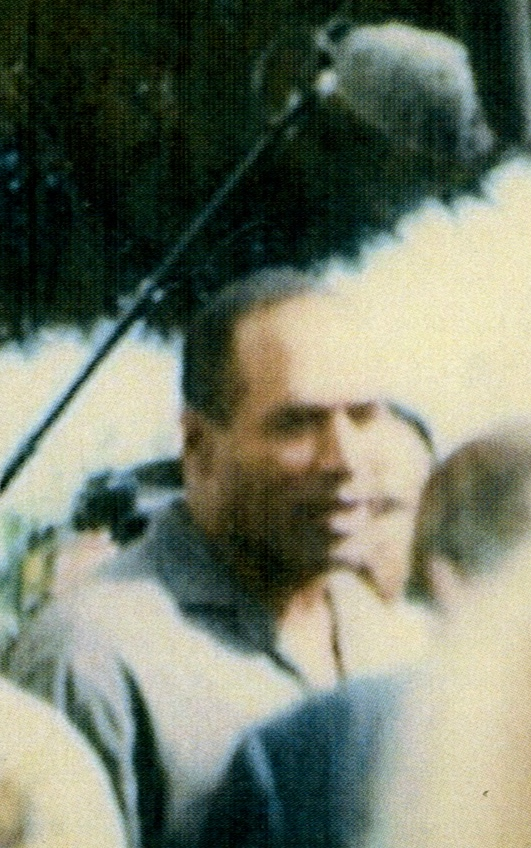
Simpson outside the Santa Monica Courthouse during his 1997 civil trial.

One significant difference between the two trials was the admission of Nicole Brown's diary entries in the civil case. Lead counsel Daniel Petrocelli explained, "The least explored aspect of the case is Simpson's motive. You cannot just say this murder was a culmination of domestic-violence incidents. You need to tell the jury a story. This was about a stormy relationship." Time magazine reported, "That strategy made the difference in understanding Simpson... Nicole's diary showed that she and Simpson were having fights in those last weeks. Their hostilities had taken a cruel turn. Simpson sent Nicole a letter that was a thinly veiled threat to report her to the IRS for failing to pay capital-gains taxes. Infuriated, she started to deny him access to the children.... She began to treat him like a stranger. That, Petrocelli said, is when three weeks of retaliation began. In that period, the lawyer argued, Simpson grew angrier and more obsessed with his ex-wife, developing a rage that resulted in death for her and Ron Goldman."

The civil judge found the diary entries were admissible because they were pertinent to Nicole's state of mind, which in turn was relevant to Simpson's motive—reversing a crucial ruling from the criminal case that excluded the diary as "inadmissible hearsay". The civil court's ruling was upheld on appeal. The Los Angeles Times wrote that this evidence "helped the plaintiffs tell their story of domestic violence" and show that when Nicole "rejected [Simpson] for good in the spring of 1994 ... he erupted in the same uncontrollable rage that had caused him to lash out at her in the past—only this time, he was brandishing a knife."

Another significant difference was Simpson being unable to Plead the Fifth and refuse to testify incase of self-incrimination, as he had already been found not guilty of both murders and therefore could not be re-tried due to double jeopardy laws. As per Simpsons pre-trial deposition regarding his movements on the night in question, at 9:30pm he drove his Bentley Mulsanne to McDonald's on Santa Monica Boulevard with Kato Kaelin and returned home around 10pm, where Kato entered the mansion to eat his take out food. OJ then used his cell phone in the front yard to call Paula Barbieri, and afterwards he practiced chipping golf balls into the kids play area for a few minutes. Having earlier moved his Bronco SUV onto Rockingham to make room for the limo to drive in, he went out to it to place the golf club in the trunk. OJ went up to his bedroom at 10:15pm where he lay on his bed watching the NBA Finals on television until around 10:30pm before taking a shower. He heard the limo driver Allan Park buzzing the gate via a phone in his bedroom ringing but didnt buzz him in after he toweled off and got partly dressed in a dark bathrobe. He briefly went downstairs around 10:55pm to check if his black golf shoes were packed in the golf bag by the front entrance, which explained the "shadowy figure" Park claimed to see entering the house. When he returned to his bedroom to finish getting dressed Park buzzed again, and this time OJ answered the phone to tell him he was running late and had just got out of the shower.

The jury found Simpson liable for the murders and awarded the victims' families $33.5 million in compensatory and punitive damages. The civil verdict "very nearly upstaged the president of the United States on the occasion of his State of the Union address", ending the case that "riveted America for two and a half years". Simpson filed for bankruptcy afterwards and relocated to Florida to protect his pension from seizure. His remaining assets were seized and auctioned off with most being purchased by critics of the verdict of the criminal trial to help the plaintiffs recoup the costs of litigation. Simpson's Heisman Trophy was sold for $255,500 to an undisclosed buyer. All the proceeds went to the Goldman family, who said they have received only one percent of the money that Simpson owes from the wrongful death suit.

In July 2017 after Simpson was granted parole, Ron Goldman’s father Fred inquired about the real estate purchases made by Sydney and Justin Simpson, Brown’s children with Simpson. David Cook, a lawyer for Fred Goldman, said he would seek bank records and depositions to follow the children's money trail and see if any of the homes were bought with their father’s cash, which could make them eligible for a clawback. “The kids’ loss is no greater than Fred’s, but Fred’s loss should be no greater than theirs,” Cook said. In June 2022 Fred alleged in court papers (intended to keep the wrongful death and battery judgment viable) that Simpson owed $96 million due to significant interest generated on the initial order to pay damages.

Following Simpson's death in 2024, Simpson estate lawyer Malcolm LeVergne pledged to prevent the Brown and Goldman families from obtaining the money which was promised in the civil trial judgement, but later reversed course.

On November 17, 2025, it was reported that the Simpson Estate agreed for pay nearly $58 million to Goldman's father to settle the civil claim, but it rejected the $117 million claim that was originally sought.

==== Alternate theories and suspects ====
While Bailey and several members of Simpson's family still advocated for Simpson's innocence, such theories have been rejected by prosecutors, witnesses and the families of Brown and Goldman, who have expressed the belief that Simpson committed the murders and was the sole perpetrator, with Hunt opining that these claims were attempts to tap into the public interest in the case and were never meant to be taken seriously.

Alternative theories have been suggested, such as that Simpson may have had accomplices in the murders, or that he was not involved at all and was framed. Several speculate that the murders were related to the Los Angeles drug trade and the murders of Michael Nigg and Brett Cantor.

The 2000 BBC TV documentary O.J.: The True Untold Story, primarily rehashes the contamination and blood planting claims from the trial and asserted that Simpson's elder son Jason is a possible suspect, due to - among other reasons - Simpson hiring defense attorneys for his children first before himself, pictures of Jason's descriptive wool cap, and an alleged prior arrangement to meet with Nicole that evening. William Dear published his findings in the book O.J. Is Innocent and I Can Prove It.

A 2012 documentary entitled My Brother the Serial Killer examined the crimes of convicted murderer Glen Edward Rogers and included claims that Rogers had killed Simpson and Goldman in California in 1994. According to Rogers' brother Clay, Rogers claimed that, before the murders, he had met Brown and was "going to take her down." During a lengthy correspondence that began in 2009 between Rogers and criminal profiler Anthony Meoli, Rogers wrote and created paintings about his involvement with the murders. During a prison meeting between the two, Rogers claimed Simpson hired him to break into Brown' house and steal some expensive jewellery. He said that Simpson had told him, "You may have to kill the bitch". In a filmed interview, Rogers' brother Clay asserts that his brother confessed his involvement. Rogers' family stated that he had informed them that he had been working for Brown in 1994 and that he had made verbal threats about her to them. Rogers later spoke to a criminal profiler about the murders, providing details about the crime and remarking that he had been hired by Simpson to steal a pair of earrings and potentially murder Brown. LAPD responded to the documentary as follows: “We know who killed Nicole Brown Simpson and Ron Goldman. We have no reason to believe that Mr. Rogers was involved.” Fred Goldman, father of Ron Goldman stated: “The overwhelming evidence at the criminal trial proved that one, and only one, person murdered Nicole Brown Simpson and Ronald Goldman. That person is O.J. Simpson and not Glen Rogers.”

== In popular culture ==
=== Media adaptations ===
- The Fox television movie The O. J. Simpson Story (1995) depicts Simpson and Brown's relationship, up to his arrest for the murders.
- The CBS TV film American Tragedy (2000) follows the trial from the perspective of Simpson's defense team.
- In 2014, ID premiered the documentary OJ: Trial of the Century, which begins on the day of the murders, ends on the reading of the verdict, and comprises actual media footage of events and reactions as they unfolded. The same year, ID premiered O.J. Simpson Trial: The Real Story, which entirely comprises archival news footage of the case.
- The first season of the FX anthology series American Crime Story, The People v. O.J. Simpson (2016), was adapted from the book The Run of His Life: The People v. O.J. Simpson (1997) by legal analyst Jeffrey Toobin. It received critical acclaim and several Emmy Awards.
- In 2016, ESPN premiered O.J.: Made in America, a five-part, eight-hour documentary by Ezra Edelman on the trial. The documentary received widespread acclaim and won the Academy Award for Best Documentary Feature.
- The Murder of Nicole Brown Simpson (2019) depicts a version of events involving Glen Edward Rogers.
- In 2020, Court TV premiered OJ25, a 25-part series documenting each week of the trial, hosted by former Los Angeles prosecutor and legal analyst Roger Cossack.
- The upcoming film The Juice explores conspiracy theories purporting to exonerate Simpson of the murders.

=== Film ===
Lost Highway was partially inspired by the case. In the film, a man is imprisoned for his wife's murder, which he does not remember, and is released after he transforms into a different man. Director David Lynch found it remarkable that Simpson, who he believed committed the murders, could continue a casual lifestyle afterward.

Lethal Weapon 4, which was released about two and a half years after the case, makes a reference to the success of Simpson's defense attorney Johnnie Cochran, after the character of detective Lee Butters apprehends a fleeing suspect and reads him his Miranda rights as follows: "If you can't afford an attorney, we'll provide you with the dumbest fucking lawyer on earth. If you get Johnnie Cochran, I'll kill ya!"

=== TV ===
Episodes of sitcoms such as The Simpsons, South Park, Roseanne, New Girl, Family Guy, It's Always Sunny in Philadelphia, and Seinfeld have mocked the case, or more specifically, Simpson himself. Saturday Night Live Weekend Update host Norm Macdonald frequently made jokes about O. J. Simpson's trial, such as the iconic line "Well, it is finally official: Murder is legal in the state of California" after Simpson's acquittal. It is rumored that the constant Simpson jokes were the cause for then NBC President Don Ohlmeyer to remove Macdonald from the Weekend Update segment and eventually from the show altogether.

At WrestleMania XII on March 31, 1996, Goldust and 'Rowdy' Roddy Piper took part in a "Hollywood Backlot Brawl" match which saw the competitors have a street fight in the namesake location, ending with Goldust fleeing in a golden Cadillac with Piper pursuing him in a white Ford Bronco, eventually reaching the Anaheim Pond arena, the main location of the PPV where the fight continued. While the event continued in the arena, picture-in-picture footage of Simpsons' police chase from June 1994 was shown and passed off as Piper driving to the arena. WWE producer Bruce Prichard revealed on his podcast in 2017 that the original plan for the match was for Simpson to face Piper, but was abandoned due to fears of potential public backlash and loss of sponsorship.

Cowlings' white Ford Bronco was featured on the reality TV show Pawn Stars in 2017. The then-owner of the vehicle estimated its value in excess of $1,000,000.

=== Music ===
The heavy-metal band Body Count recorded the song "I Used to Love Her", sung from the perspective of O. J. Simpson murdering his wife, on their 1997 album Violent Demise: The Last Days. A 2021 article in Metal Hammer described the song as "jaw-droppingly offensive". In Good Charlotte's song, "Lifestyles of the Rich & Famous", they reference the case in the second verse: "Well did you know when you were famous you could kill you wife And there's no such thing as 25 to life As long as you've got the cash, to pay for Cochran."

R&B group H-Town dedicated their album Ladies Edition, Woman's World (1997) to Brown, to help victims of domestic violence. Electronic musician James Ferraro referenced the police chase in the song "White Bronco" on his 2015 album Skid Row.

Hip hop artist Magneto Dayo released a 2013 "diss track" song titled "OJ Simpson" in which he insults his ex-girlfriend/artist V-Nasty by referencing the Simpson murder case. Rapper Jay-Z's song "The Story of O.J." references the trial. Kendrick Lamar included Simpson in the music video for "The Heart Part 5", using Deepfake technology. The infamous glove also appears on the single's cover. Rapper Eminem references the murder case in his song "Role Model", where he claims to have done the murder with Marcus Allen.

=== Video games ===
Duke Nukem 3D has several allusions to the Simpson trial, including a television playing the Bronco chase.

=== Satire ===
Joey Skaggs, under the alias Dr. Joseph Bonuso, Ph.D., announced the "Solomon Project," a fictional AI program purportedly designed to eliminate bias in the U.S. judicial system. After CNN reported on the project’s claim that the AI had found O.J. Simpson guilty, Skaggs disclosed the hoax.

== Statistical analysis of the trial ==
The trial provided an example of incorrect use of Bayes theorem in the courtroom that is used in statistics courses around the world. O.J. Simpson's prior history of using violence against his wife was a central issue in the trial. The defense attorney Alan Dershowitz attempted to minimize the significance of this history by claiming that only 0.1% of men who abuse their wives ultimately murder them. In other words, he claimed that the probability that a man murdered his wife given that he has previously abused her is very low. But this reasoning is flawed because it ignores a crucial piece of information: the wife has in fact been murdered. The legally and probabilistically relevant question is not how often domestic violence leads to murder in general, but rather the probability that a husband is the murderer of his wife given that he physically abused her and that she was murdered. Using this Bayesian reasoning, this probability rises to 81%, making the history of domestic violence a statistically significant evidence of guilt.

Kunle Olumide partitioned the evidence into seven categories (motives, opportunity, gloves, weapon, blood stains, knowledge of guilt, and identification) and used a Bayesian network to analyse the evidence and construct likelihood ratios. Based on motives the likelihood ratios ranged from about 0.15 (favouring innocence) to 28 (favouring guilt). Based on opportunity likelihood ratios ranged from 10 to 47, strongly favouring guilt. When combined, the aggregate likelihood ratio for the two categories was as high as 1316, meaning the evidence was over a thousand times more likely if Simpson were guilty than if he were innocent.

Paul Thagard (2010) analysed the trial. Thagard proposes that jurors form judgments not simply on isolated facts or probabilities but through constructing coherent explanations. They assess competing narratives such as "Simpson is innocent" vs. "Simpson is guilty" based on how well each narrative fits the set of available evidence and prior beliefs. This includes both logical consistency and emotional resonance. Consequently, the weight of some evidence is amplified while the weight of others is discounted.

== Exhibits ==
The suit Simpson wore when he was acquitted was donated by Simpson's former agent Mike Gilbert to the Newseum in 2010. The Newseum had multiple trial-related items in their collection, including press passes, newspapers and the mute button that Superior Court Judge Lance Ito used when he wanted to shut off the live microphone in court so lawyers could talk privately during the trial. The museum's acquisition of the suit ended the legal battle between Gilbert and Fred Goldman, both of whom claimed the right to the clothing.

Cowlings's Bronco is on display at the Alcatraz East crime museum in Pigeon Forge, Tennessee.

In 2017, Adam Papagan curated a pop-up museum showcasing artifacts and ephemera from the trial at Coagula Curatorial gallery in Los Angeles.

== See also ==
- Chewbacca defense
- List of homicides in California
- Murder of Brett Cantor, unsolved killing (in 1993) with possible connection to Simpson murder case
- Murder of Michael Nigg, unsolved killing (in 1995) of Goldman's friend and fellow Mezzaluna waiter
- List of unsolved murders (1980–1999)
- Trial of Yolanda Saldívar – the "Hispanic O.J. Simpson trial"
- Robert Blake and Bonny Lee Bakley
- 1995 Okinawa rape incident High profile trial from the same time
- Lizzie Borden

== Bibliography ==
- Bailey, F. Lee; Rabe, Jean (2008). When the Husband is the Suspect. New York: Forge. ISBN 978-0765355232.
- Bugliosi, Vincent (1997) [1996]. Outrage: The Five Reasons Why O.J. Simpson Got Away with Murder. New York: Dell Publishing. ISBN 978-0440223825.
- Clark, Marica (1998). Without a Doubt. New York: Penguin Publishing. ISBN 978-0140259773.
- Cochran, Johnnie L Jr. (1997). Journey to Justice. New York: Ballantine Books. ISBN 978-0345413673.
- Cooley, Amanda; Bess, Carrie; Rubin-Jackson, Marsha; Byrnes, Tom (1996). Walker, Mike (ed.). Madam Foreman: A Rush to Judgement?. Dove Books. ISBN 978-0787109189.
- Darden, Christopher A. (1996). In Contempt. New York: HarperCollins. ISBN 978-0060391836.
- Dear, William C. (2012). O.J. is Innocent and I Can Prove It: The Shocking Truth about the Murders of Nicole Simpson and Ron Goldman. New York: Skyhorse Publishing. ISBN 978-1616086206.
- Dershowitz, Alan M. (2004). America on Trial: Inside the Legal Battles that Transformed our Nation. New York: Warner Books. ISBN 978-0446520584.
- Goldberg, Hank M. (1996). The Prosecution Responds: An O.J. Simpson Trial Prosecutor Reveals What Really Happened. Secaucus, New Jersey: Carol Publishing Group. ISBN 978-1559723619.
- Lange, Tom; Vannatter, Philip; Moldea, Dan E. (1997). Evidence Dismissed: The Inside Story of the Police Investigation of O.J. Simpson. New York: Pocket Books. ISBN 978-0671009595.
- Schiller, Lawrence; Willwerth, James (1996). American Tragedy: The Uncensored Story of the Simpson Defense. New York: Random House. ISBN 978-0679456827.
- Schuetz, Janice E.; Lilley, Lin S., eds. (1999). The O.J. Simpson Trials: Rhetoric, Media, and the Law. Carbondale, Illinois: Southern Illinois University Press. ISBN 978-0809322817.
- Shapiro, Robert L.; Warren, Larkin (1996). The Search for Justice: A Defense Attorney's Brief on the O.J. Simpson Case. New York: Warner Books. ISBN 978-0446520812.
- Taylor Gibbs, Jewelle (1996). Race and Justice: Rodney King and O.J. Simpson in a House Divided. San Francisco: Jossey-Bass. ISBN 978-0787902643.
- Toobin, Jeffrey (1997). The Run of His Life: The People v. O.J. Simpson. Touchstone Books. ISBN 978-0684842783.
