= Fredric Rieders =

Fredric Rieders (July 9, 1922 – November 26, 2005) was an internationally renowned forensic toxicologist. He was born in Vienna, Austria and reportedly emigrated to the United States alone at age 16 to escape Nazism. During the O.J. Simpson murder trial, he testified that the presence of detectable amounts of the preservative EDTA found in blood at the scene indicated it may not have come from a human being, but possibly was planted.

Other of his well-known cases include the Robert Curley, in which Curley's wife, Joann, poisoned him with thallium; another case is that of Michael Swango, or "Dr. Death"—a serial killer who killed as many as 60 of his patients at various hospitals he worked at using succinylcholine and epinephrine. Rieders also offered testimony in 1991 at one of the many trials at which Jack Kevorkian was a defendant. Rieders testified that Kevorkian might have used an excessive amount of the sedative thiopental, and the sedative might actually have killed her before a lethal dose of potassium chloride had a chance to stop her heart, as Dr. Kevorkian had intended.

Rieders received his PhD in Pharmacology-Toxicology from Thomas Jefferson University. He worked as the Chief Toxicologist for the City of Philadelphia for fourteen years. He later founded National Medical Services in Willow Grove, Pennsylvania in 1970. Now called NMS Labs, it is a private toxicology lab that handles forensic and clinical toxicology.

Rieders established the non-profit Fredric Rieders Family Renaissance Foundation. Most notably, he established the non-profit Forensic Sciences Mentoring Institute, described as a "hands-on research and academic instruction organization designed to support scientific and humanitarian activities serving students of all ages but specifically the young and especially the disadvantaged." Currently the Foundation is affiliated with Arcadia University's Master of Science in Forensic Science program. Rieders died on November 26, 2005, aged 83.

== O.J. Simpson murder trial ==
Dr. Rieders testified in the criminal trial of O.J Simpson on July 24, 1995 and August 14, 1995. His testimony was interrupted because he had to leave the country. When he returned, according to the Los Angeles Times, "Not only did he refuse to answer questions directly, but his mood ranged from belligerent to confused."
