= Mike Gilbert =

American sports agent

Mike Gilbert is an American retired sports agent, most notable for representing O. J. Simpson. Following Simpson's trial and acquittal for the murders of his ex-wife Nicole Brown Simpson and Ron Goldman, Gilbert wrote How I Helped O. J. Get Away with Murder: The Shocking Inside Story of Violence, Loyalty, Regret and Remorse. The book was published by Regnery Publishing in May 2008, and discusses Gilbert's 18-year-long relationship with Simpson, including the influence of their personal and professional relationship in the lead up to, during, and following the trial. Gilbert claims that the gloves did not fit because, on his advice, Simpson stopped taking his arthritis medicine, which made his hands swell. This is disputed by records of the trial when it was noted Simpson "has arthritis and we looked at the medication he takes and some of it is anti-inflammatory and we are told he has not taken the stuff for a day and it caused swelling in the joints and inflammation in his hands". The Los Angeles County Jail doctor confirmed Simpson was taking his arthritis medication every day and that the jail's medical records verified this. Gilbert's book also details Simpson confessing to the killings. Gilbert describes how Simpson, having smoked marijuana, taken a sleeping pill, and while drinking beer, confided to him at his Brentwood home weeks after his trial what happened the night of the murders. Simpson said, "If she hadn't opened that door with a knife in her hand... she'd still be alive." Gilbert said that this confirmed his belief that Simpson had confessed.

Gilbert was alleged to be the source of some of the memorabilia items that Simpson tried to recover from two memorabilia dealers at the Palace Station Hotel Casino in Las Vegas, Nevada. Simpson was later convicted of all charges and sentenced to serve 9 to 33 years in a Nevada State prison. Gilbert was featured in Ezra Edelman's 2016 documentary, O.J.: Made in America, in which he expresses his friendship and working relationship with Simpson, and the role he played in the murder trial.
