= Dream Team (law) =

Team of lawyers who represented O. J. Simpson

The "Dream Team" was the team of trial lawyers that represented American athlete O. J. Simpson in his 1995 trial for the alleged murders of his former wife, Nicole Brown Simpson, and Ron Goldman. The team included Robert Shapiro, Johnnie Cochran, Carl Douglas, Shawn Chapman Holley, Gerald Uelmen, Robert Kardashian, Alan Dershowitz, F. Lee Bailey, Barry Scheck, Peter Neufeld, Robert Blasier, Murrough O'Rourke and William Thompson.

== The "Dream Team" lawyers ==
=== Robert Shapiro ===
Robert Shapiro joined Simpson's defense team one week after the murder, when Howard Weitzman withdrew from the case, stating his workload was too heavy to continue as chair. As defense chair, Shapiro was called the "architect" of the Simpson defense for building the high-profile legal team that would later be dubbed the "Dream Team". Shapiro led the defense team through much of the trial before Johnnie Cochran took over as the lead chair. Shapiro is the co-founder of RightCounsel.com and is a senior partner in the Los Angeles-based law firm Glaser Weil Fink Jacobs Howard Avchen & Shapiro, LLP. He also co-founded LegalZoom.

=== Johnnie Cochran ===
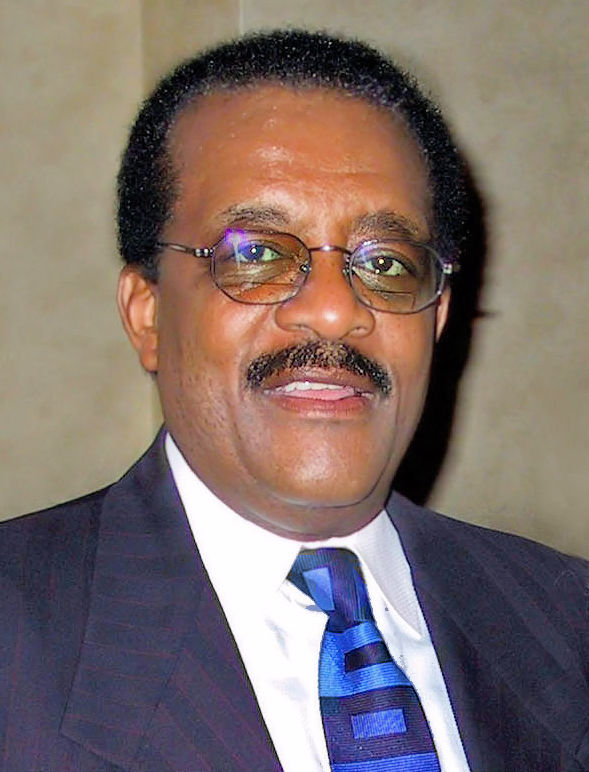
Cochran in 2001

Cochran joined the Simpson defense team and later took over as its chair, during the trial. In his closing arguments, Cochran famously said, "If it doesn't fit, you must acquit," referring to the fact that the glove the prosecutors alleged Simpson wore during the murder did not fit Simpson's hand. Cochran was diagnosed with a brain tumor in December 2003 and subsequently died in his home in Los Angeles, on March 29, 2005.

=== Robert Kardashian ===
Robert Kardashian was a close friend of Simpson. Simpson stayed in Kardashian's house to avoid the media while the investigations and subsequent media fallout concerning the murders of Nicole Brown Simpson and Ronald Goldman unfolded. When Simpson failed to turn himself in on June 17, 1994, Kardashian read a letter written by Simpson to the media that had assembled outside of his house. Kardashian ended up reactivating his license to practice law, which he had let lapse prior to the Simpson case, to join Simpson's defense team. After the case, he doubted Simpson's innocence, eventually severing ties with Simpson, stating that had he known his family would get death threats, he would have never taken the case. Kardashian was diagnosed with esophageal cancer in July 2003. He died at the age of 59 on September 30, 2003.

=== F. Lee Bailey ===
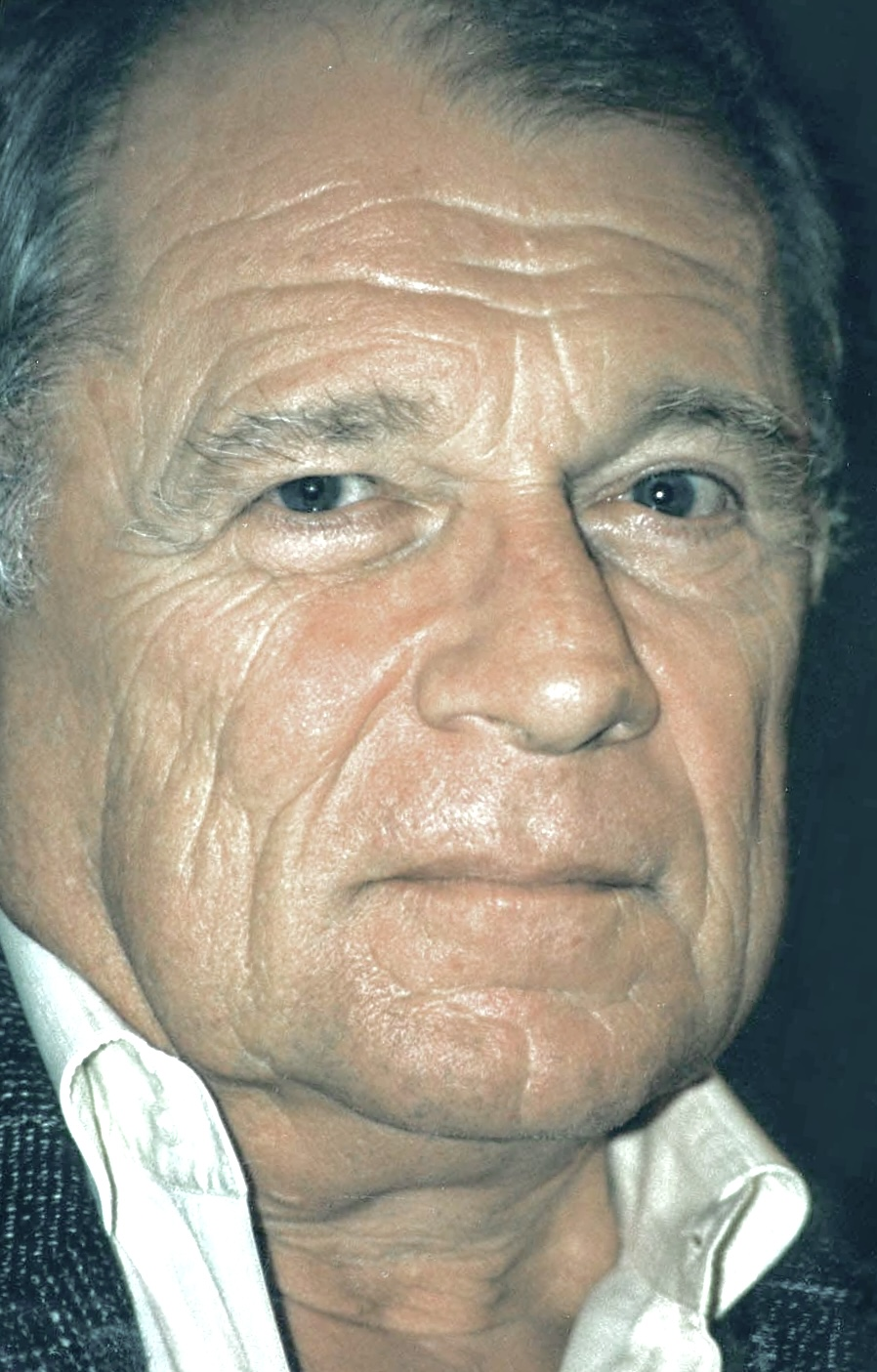
Bailey in 1993

F. Lee Bailey joined the defense team before the preliminary hearing and handled many of the defense team's press conferences. Bailey's most notable contribution to the defense was his cross-examination of LAPD investigator Mark Fuhrman. In a press conference leading up to his cross-examination of Fuhrman, Bailey said, "Any lawyer in his right mind who would not be looking forward to cross-examining Mark Fuhrman is an idiot." Bailey died on June 3, 2021, at the age of 87.

=== Alan Dershowitz ===
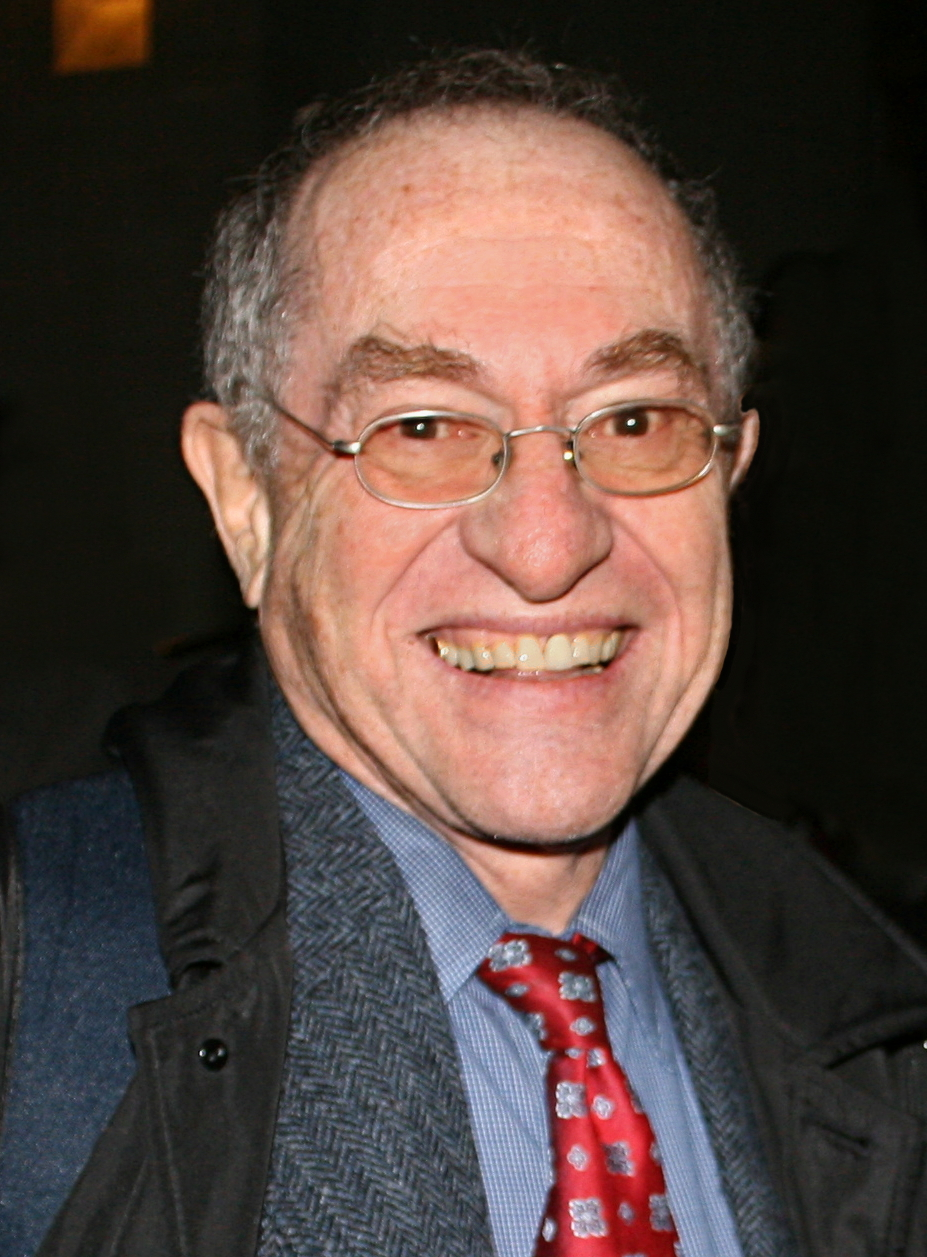
Dershowitz in 2009

Alan Dershowitz was the Felix Frankfurter professor emeritus at Harvard Law School and as of 2013 remained one of the most successful lawyers and legal scholars in the country. After representing Simpson, he has represented Julian Assange, Jeffrey Epstein and Harvey Weinstein. He has also served as a member of the legal team for President Donald Trump during his first impeachment trial. Dershowitz has written multiple books about law and politics including Reasonable Doubts: The Criminal Justice System and the O. J. Simpson Case and The Case for Peace.

=== Barry Scheck ===
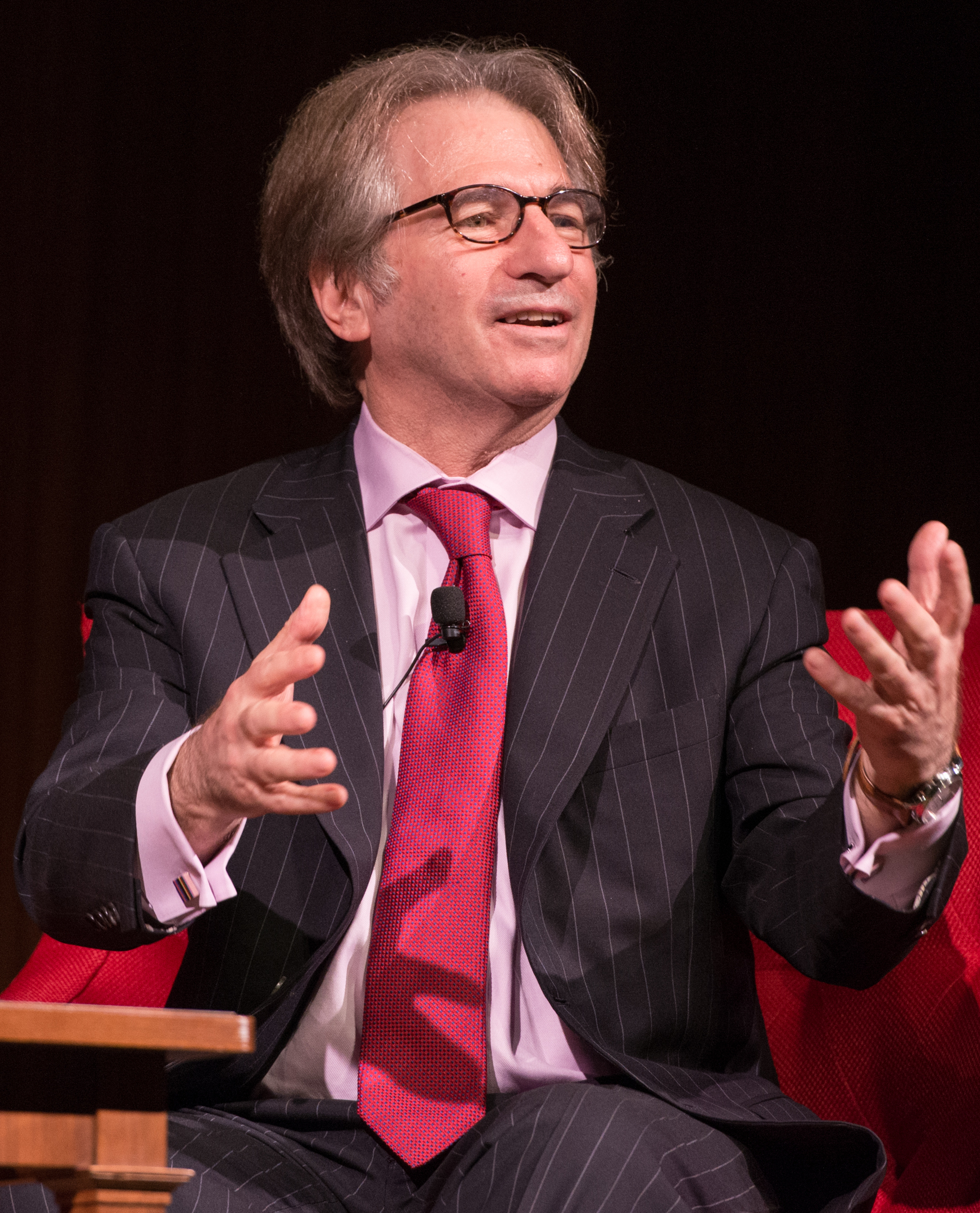
Scheck in 2014

Barry Scheck, a law professor at the Benjamin N. Cardozo School of Law in New York City, is a forensic expert. Scheck is also known for his work as co-founder and co-director of the Innocence Project, a non-profit organization that uses DNA evidence to clear the names of wrongfully convicted inmates.

=== Peter Neufeld ===
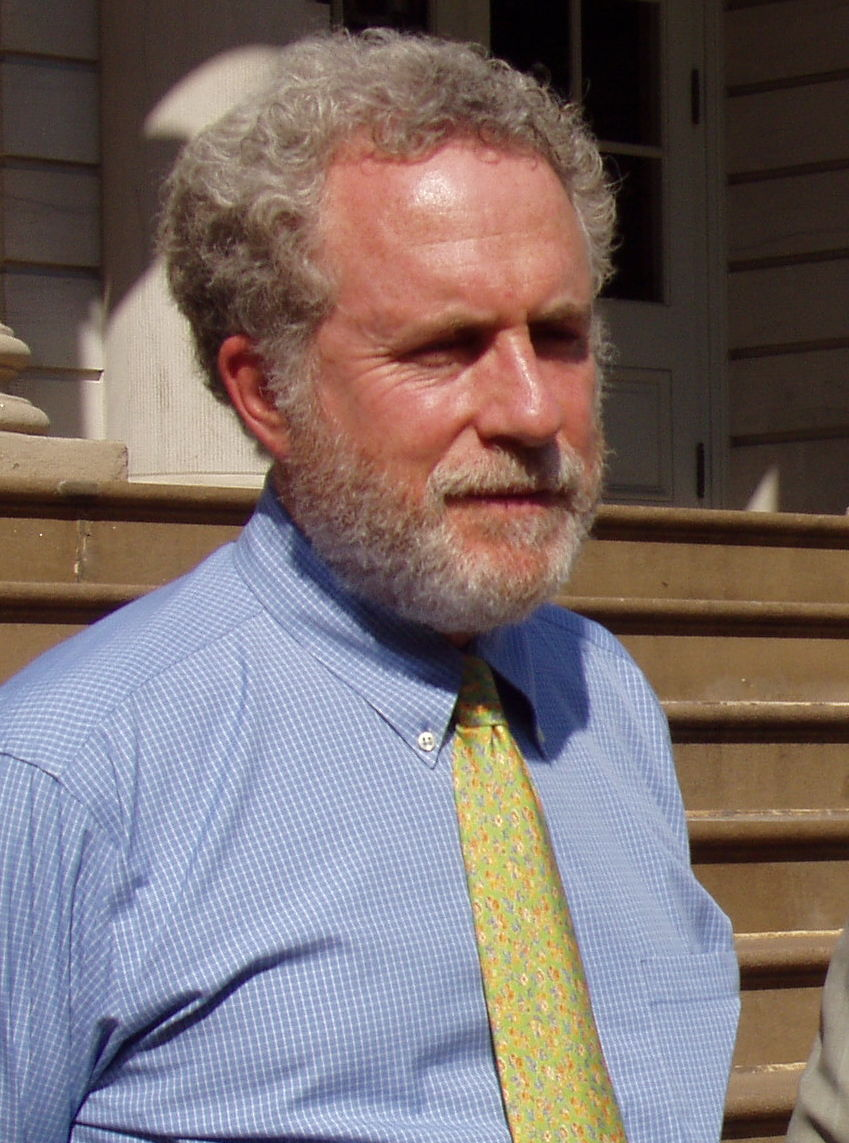
Neufeld in 2009

Peter Neufeld joined the Simpson defense team to assist with undermining the prosecution's DNA and forensic evidence. He is perhaps best known for discrediting the credibility of the blood trail between Nicole Brown Simpson's body and O. J. Simpson's car. Neufeld is a co-founder of the Innocence Project, along with fellow "Dream Team" member Barry Scheck. Neufeld is currently a partner at Neufeld Scheck & Brustin, LLP in New York.

=== Gerald F. Uelmen ===
Gerald Uelmen was part of O. J. Simpson's defense team during the O. J. Simpson murder case. Uelmen says he devised the memorable line used by Johnnie Cochran in the closing argument, "If it doesn't fit, you must acquit." Uelmen is currently a professor at the Santa Clara University School of Law, where he served as Dean from 1986 to 1994. He served as defense counsel in the trials of Daniel Ellsberg and Christian Brando. In 2006, he was appointed Executive Director for the California Commission on the Fair Administration of Justice, created by the California State Senate to examine the causes of wrongful convictions and propose reforms of the California criminal justice system.

=== Robert Blasier ===
Blasier was a student of Dershowitz, and was also counsel for Simpson's civil trial.

=== Carl E. Douglas ===
Carl Douglas was widely considered one of Johnnie Cochran's top lawyers. He later became the managing attorney of the Law Office of Johnnie Cochran, Jr. before leaving the firm in 1998, to form The Douglas Law Group (now known as Douglas / Hicks Law).

=== Shawn Holley ===
Shawn Holley also worked for Cochran, and is a partner at Kinsella Weitzman Iser Kump Holley LLP, a boutique firm in Santa Monica.

== Verdict ==
On October 3, 1995, at 10:00 a.m., after just four hours of deliberation, the jury found Simpson not guilty on both murder counts. News of the verdict had a disruptive effect in the United States and abroad, as an estimated 100 million people worldwide watched or listened to the verdict announcement. Before the verdict was read, President Bill Clinton was briefed on potential security measures, in case rioting occurred following the announcement. The Supreme Court of the United States received a note documenting the verdict, which the justices passed to each other while listening to the oral arguments of the case at hand.

== Criticism ==
In his book Outrage: The Five Reasons Why O. J. Simpson Got Away with Murder, Vincent Bugliosi dismisses the idea that Simpson's defense team was a "Dream Team", stating that Shapiro had never tried a murder case before, Cochran was primarily a civil lawyer who may not have won a single murder case before a jury, Bailey had lost his last big case with Patty Hearst earlier, and Dershowitz was a prominent appellate lawyer, not a trial lawyer.

== Portrayal in film and television ==
The Dream Team's success has been portrayed in multiple documentaries and docudramas.

- In 1995, Fox premiered the TV movie The O. J. Simpson Story, which depicted Bobby Hosea as Simpson as well as a few of the team, including Bruce Weitz as Robert Shapiro.
- In 2000, 20th Century Fox produced An American Tragedy, with Ving Rhames as Johnnie Cochran, Christopher Plummer as F. Lee Bailey, Ron Silver as Robert Shapiro, Robert LuPone as Robert Kardashian, Richard Cox as Alan Dershowitz, Bruno Kirby as Barry Scheck, Nicholas Pryor as Gerald Uelmen, and Raymond Forchion as O. J. Simpson. Coincidentally, Silver previously portrayed Alan Dershowitz in Reversal of Fortune.
- On February 2, 2016, FX premiered the first season of the anthology series, American Crime Story, titled, The People v. O. J. Simpson: American Crime Story. The Dream Team was portrayed by Courtney B. Vance (Cochran), John Travolta (Shapiro), Nathan Lane (Bailey), Evan Handler (Dershowitz), David Schwimmer (Kardashian), and Rob Morrow (Scheck).
- In June 2016, ESPN premiered O.J.: Made in America, a 5-part, 8-hour documentary on the trial, by Ezra Edelman.
- In January 2025 Netflix released a four-part documentary series, American Manhunt: O.J. Simpson, covering the trial.
