= American Tragedy (film) =

- Based on: American Tragedy: The Uncensored Story of the Simpson Defense by Lawrence Schiller and James Willwerth
- Written by: Norman Mailer
- Directed by: Lawrence Schiller
- Starring: Ving Rhames; Ron Silver; Bruno Kirby; Raymond Forchion; Christopher Plummer; Richard Cox
- Music by: Bill Conti
- Country of origin: United States
- Original language: English

Production
- Producers: Lawrence Schiller; Lynn Raynor
- Cinematography: Bruce Surtees
- Editors: Katina Zinner; Peter Zinner
- Running time: 170 minutes

Original release
- Network: CBS
- Release: November 12, 2000

American Tragedy is a 2000 American television film broadcast on CBS from November 12, 2000, to November 15, 2000, that is based on the O. J. Simpson murder case for the 1994 murder of his ex-wife, Nicole Brown Simpson, and her friend, Ron Goldman. Ving Rhames starred as defense attorney Johnnie Cochran. It was directed by Lawrence Schiller, and the screenplay was adapted from Schiller's book, American Tragedy: The Uncensored Story of the Simpson Defense, by novelist Norman Mailer, who had previously collaborated with Schiller on The Executioner's Song. It was produced by Fox Television Studios. Mailer publicly criticized CBS for its promotion of the miniseries, which used ads that focused on the fact that Simpson tried unsuccessfully to have the courts block its broadcast. It won a Satellite Award and was nominated for a Golden Globe Award.

== Cast ==
- Ving Rhames as Johnnie Cochran
- Ron Silver as Robert Shapiro
- Bruno Kirby as Barry Scheck
- Darryl Alan Reed as Carl Douglas
- Nicholas Pryor as Gerry Uelman
- Robert LuPone as Robert Kardashian
- Ruben Santiago-Hudson as Christopher Darden
- Diana LaMar as Marcia Clark
- Christopher Plummer as F. Lee Bailey
- Richard Cox as Alan Dershowitz
- Raymond Forchion as O. J. Simpson
- Clyde Kusatsu as Judge Lance Ito
