= Nicole Brown Simpson =

German-American murder victim (1959–1994)

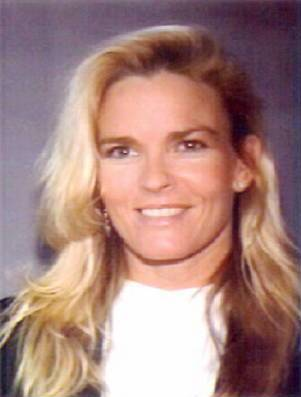
- Brown Simpson in 1991
- Born: Nicole Brown; May 19, 1959; Frankfurt, West Germany
- Died: June 12, 1994 (aged 35); Los Angeles, California, U.S.
- Cause of death: Murder via stabbing
- Resting place: Ascension Cemetery, Lake Forest, California; 33.6512°N 117.6935°W
- Spouse: O. J. Simpson (m. 1985; div. 1992)
- Children: 2
- Nicole Brown Simpson's voice Simpson's first 911 call made after divorce Recorded October 25, 1993

Nicole Brown Simpson (née Brown; May 19, 1959 – June 12, 1994) was a German-American woman best known for being the second wife of American professional football player, actor, and media personality O. J. Simpson. She was murdered outside her Los Angeles home, along with her friend Ron Goldman.

Born in Frankfurt, West Germany, Brown moved to the U.S. early in her life. She met Simpson in 1977, and they would marry in February 1985, five years after Simpson had retired from professional American football. Their marriage lasted for eight years, and they had a daughter and a son together. Reports suggest that Simpson emotionally, verbally, and physically abused Brown throughout their relationship, which continued after their divorce. They made an attempt at reconciliation, but later broke up again, seemingly permanently, in May 1994.

In June 1994, Brown and Goldman were stabbed to death, and Simpson was tried for the murders. Following a highly publicized criminal trial, Simpson was acquitted of all charges, though he was later found liable for the wrongful deaths in a civil lawsuit in 1997. No other suspects have ever been identified, and the killings remain unsolved, although Brown's family has expressed the belief that Simpson committed the murders and was the sole perpetrator.

== Early life ==
Nicole Brown was born on May 19, 1959, in Frankfurt, West Germany, to Juditha Anne "Judy" Brown (née Baur) and Louis Hezekiah "Lou" Brown Jr. Her mother was German while her father was American. Lou Brown served in World War II as a pilot and married Juditha in Switzerland after the war. Nicole was the second of four daughters, the others being Denise (b. 1957), Dominique (b. 1964), and Tanya (b. 1970). From her father's previous marriage, she had two older half-sisters (Wendy and Margit) and one older half-brother (Tracy). After moving to the United States, she attended Rancho Alamitos High School in Garden Grove, California. She graduated from Dana Hills High School, in Dana Point, California, in 1976. She was raised Catholic. According to her friend and former roommate David LeBon, Brown had an interest in photography and was influenced by the creative environment in which she lived. LeBon recalled that she considered pursuing photography more seriously and expressed an interest in studying the field.

== Relationship with O. J. Simpson ==
=== Early relationship ===
Brown met American professional football player, actor, and media personality O. J. Simpson in 1977, when he was 30 and she was 18. At the time, she was waitressing at The Daisy, a nightclub in Beverly Hills, California. They began dating while Simpson was still married to his first wife, Marguerite Whitley, who was then pregnant with their daughter Aaren. Simpson and Whitley divorced in March 1979. "Before we had separated in 1977, Nicole would drive by the house or check to see if his car was there," Marguerite later said in an interview with Barbara Walters in 1995. "She would call many times and say that she was Cathy Randa, who's O.J.'s secretary. So I knew who she was. I didn't actually know her personally."

In a 2024 People interview, Brown's older sister Denise revealed that Simpson was occasionally hostile towards Nicole even during the early days of their relationship, including on one occasion in 1977 after she and her family had gone to upstate New York to attend a Buffalo Bills game that Simpson was playing in. According to Denise, he "flipped out" during this occasion, after seeing Nicole kiss a mutual male friend on the cheek and "had her in the upstairs bathroom crying. He said, 'You embarrassed me.'"

Brown had a non-speaking acting part as "Passenger on Bus" in the 1980 TV film Detour to Terror, starring Simpson who was also executive producer on the film. During the 1984 Summer Olympics torch relay, Simpson carried the torch on Santa Monica's California Incline road, with Brown running a few steps behind him. Simpson was among the many celebrities who attended the premiere of the Michael Jackson short film Captain EO in 1986, which Brown also attended.

=== Marriage ===
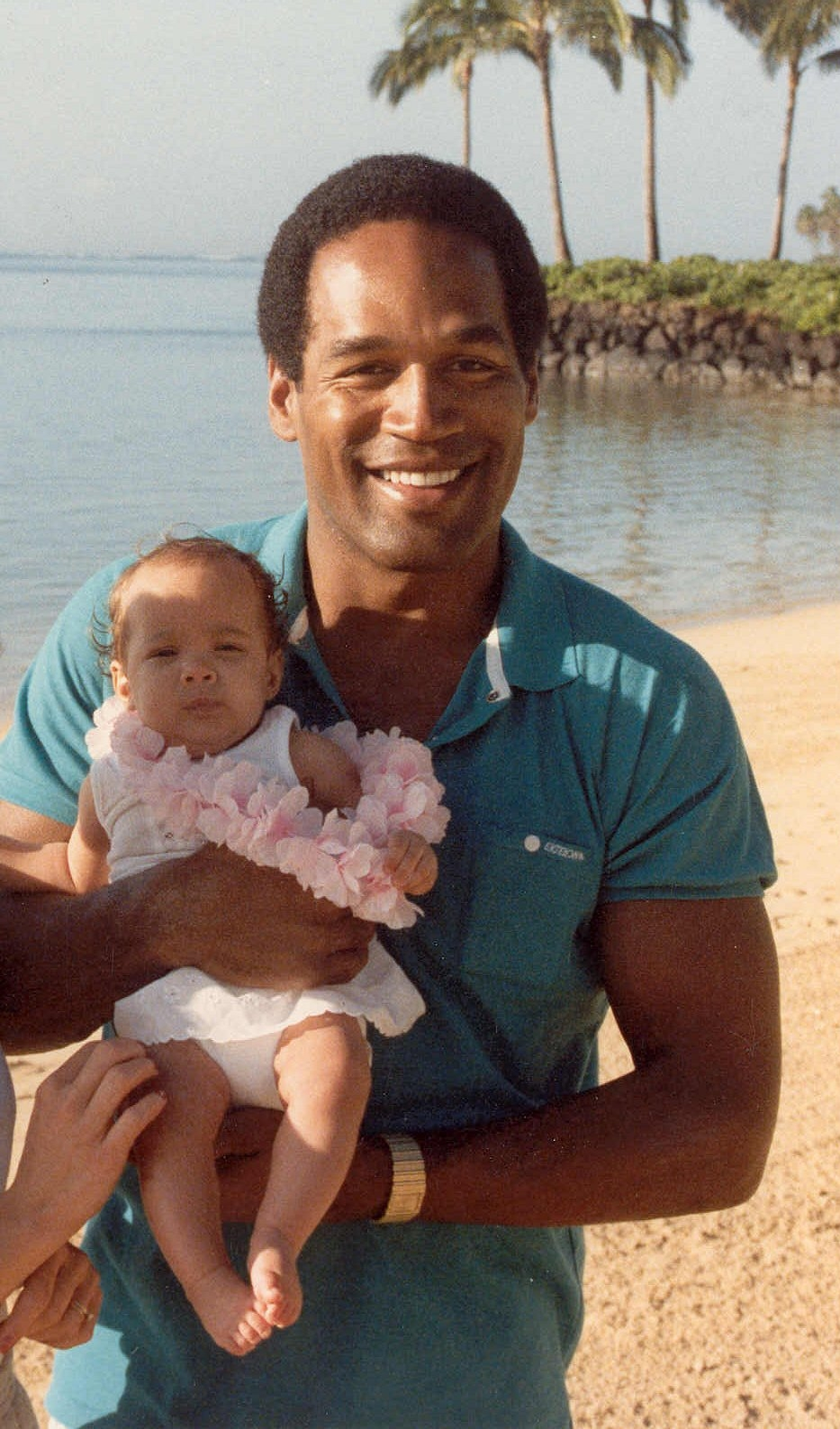
O. J. Simpson with his and Brown's daughter Sydney, in 1986

Brown and Simpson married on February 2, 1985, five years after his retirement from professional football. The couple had two children, Sydney Brooke Simpson (b. 1985) and Justin Ryan Simpson (b. 1988). The marriage lasted seven years. According to Denise Brown, Nicole considered motherhood to be her crowning achievement, though Simpson became more volatile towards her after the children were born.

According to Sheila Weller, "[Simpson and Brown] were a dramatic, fractious, mutually obsessed couple before they married, after they married, after they divorced in 1992, and after they reconciled."

==== Domestic violence ====
According to multiple accounts, Simpson emotionally, verbally, and physically abused Brown throughout their relationship, and the abuse continued after their divorce. According to Brown's sister Dominique, Simpson referred to his wife as a "fat pig" during a pregnancy. Family friend Robin Greer stated that Simpson had refused to have sex with Brown in the months after her pregnancy because of its effect on her weight. Greer also claimed that he had Brown followed numerous times, and would "plant" people in the clubs she and Brown went out to at night to report their activities back to Simpson.

Accounts from Brown's diary date physical abuse as far back as 1978. She called the police on Simpson numerous times over the course of their marriage, but most of the calls were not met with serious response by the LAPD because of Simpson's celebrity status. The first police report was filed after an incident on New Year's Day 1989. On December 31, Brown had phoned the police, saying that she thought Simpson was going to kill her. She was found by the responding officer hiding in the bushes outside their home, "badly beaten and half-naked". Authorities said Simpson had "punched, slapped, and kicked" her. When the responding officer announced his intent to arrest Simpson, he sped away from the cops in his car. Eventually, he pleaded no contest to spousal abuse. Brown dropped the charges after her parents allegedly encouraged her to reconcile with Simpson, who was enabling her father, Louis, to invest in a lucrative Hertz car rental facility at The Ritz Carlton at Monarch Bay, California, which significantly benefited the Brown family financially.

In addition to the physical abuse, Simpson was also reported to have been an avid womanizer who engaged in numerous infidelities while married to Brown. In the 2016 documentary O.J.: Made in America, Robin Greer said that the couple were constantly fighting over Simpson's affairs with other women. Greer even noted how Simpson had made repeated advances towards her as well. The police report from the New Years Day incident indicated that Simpson had said: "I don't want that woman [Brown] sleeping in my bed anymore! I got two women, and I don't want that woman in my bed anymore." At the time of their separation, he informed Brown of his ongoing one-year extramarital affair with Tawny Kitaen. The affair was revealed at Simpson's 1997 civil trial for wrongful death.

Among the more caustic accounts, in American Tragedy: The Uncensored Story of the Simpson Defense, former maid Bethy Vaquerano alleged that Brown was racist and had been physically abusive towards Simpson. In her book I’m Not Dancing Anymore, Simpson’s niece Terri Baker said Brown could be very insulting to people when she was angry and that she observed Brown insulting and slapping Simpson in the past.

A family friend claimed that Simpson had told Brown's friends that if he ever "caught her with anyone, he would kill her". Brown's friend Kris Jenner claimed that Brown had at one point told her, "Things are really bad between O.J. and I, and he's going to kill me, and he's going to get away with it." The two broke up again, seemingly permanently, in May 1994. In total, prosecutors for Simpson's murder trial found 62 incidents of abusive behavior by Simpson towards Brown. News reporting regarding these incidents led to California enforcing its 1986 laws to better protect domestic violence victims. Hertz continued airing its commercials featuring Simpson until they cut all ties with him amid the murder trial.

==== Divorce ====
In January 1992, Brown moved into a rental home in Brentwood, a neighborhood in Los Angeles, California. The property was a four-bedroom, Tudor-style house with 3,400 square feet (320 m^{2}) on Gretna Green Way, where she lived for two years.

Simpson filed for divorce on February 25, 1992, citing irreconcilable differences. They then shared custody of their two children. During this time Simpson continued his abuse of Brown. She told her mother after the divorce that Simpson was following her and stated, "I go to the gas station, he's there. I go to the Payless shoe store, and he's there. I'm driving, and he's behind me.'"

==== Ongoing relationship and abuse ====
Reports suggest that in 1993, after the divorce, Brown and Simpson made an attempt at reconciliation. Brown initiated the reconciliation, sending Simpson a video of their wedding and a letter begging him to take her back and stating that she wanted to put their family back together.

Nicole Brown Simpson second 911 call October 25, 1993
Simpson's second 911 call made after divorce, Recorded October 25, 1993

On October 25, 1993, Brown called the police twice to report Simpson breaking into her house and ranting and raving, after he had allegedly found a photo of Keith Zlomsowitch, a man Brown had dated while they were broken up. According to Zlomsowitch, an ex girlfriend of his approached Simpson on the set of Naked Gun 33⅓: The Final Insult and told Simpson disparaging things about himself and Brown when they were together. The second time Brown called 911, she tearfully pleaded with the 911 operator for help, stating that Simpson was "fucking going nuts", was screaming at her roommate Kato Kaelin and was "going to beat the shit out of me!" Simpson angrily shouted in the background, "You didn't give a shit about the kids when you were [having sex with him] in the living room! They were here! Did you care about the kids then?!" In the 911 call Simpson can also be heard accusing Zlomsowitch of being a drug addict and Zlomsowitch‘s ex girlfriend of working for Heidi Fleiss. He repeatedly said, "I'm leaving with my two fucking kids is when I'm leaving," as Brown urged him to leave her house. When the police arrived, Brown was secretly recorded by Sgt. Craig Lally, telling him, "I just got frightened tonight. When he gets this crazed I get scared. And he hasn't hit me in four years."

Brown moved out of the house on Gretna Green Way several months after this incident, and the relationship ended.

== Post-divorce life ==
Brown met and became friends with Kato Kaelin on a skiing trip in Aspen, Colorado, in December 1992. He later moved into the guest house on Brown's property on Gretna Green Way and lived there for a year. Kaelin paid rent and helped take care of Sydney and Justin as part of the living arrangement. Brown also entertained other suitors, including restaurateur Keith Zlomsowitch and Marcus Allen. Despite speculation of her having been a recreational drug user during this time, there is no solid evidence of Brown using drugs; she had no drugs in her system at the time of her death and her house was clear of drug paraphernalia.

Brown and Faye Resnick first met in 1990. According to Robert Kardashian, Resnick only knew Brown for a year and a half. The two socialized in and around Brentwood, Los Angeles and vacationed in Mexico together. Resnick's third husband, Paul, reported that a concerned Brown called him in early June 1994 to report that "Faye was getting out of control" and abusing cocaine again. Resnick stayed for several days at Brown's condominium until on June 9, 1994, Brown and several other friends conducted an intervention and persuaded Resnick to check into the Exodus Recovery Center in Marina Del Rey, California.

In January 1994, Brown moved just a few minutes away from her home on Gretna Green Way to a three-story, rental townhouse, 875 South Bundy Drive, in Brentwood. It was a Mediterranean-style residence that was 3,400 square feet with multiple patios and a "rooftop sundeck". At the time, she drove a Ferrari, which she later lent to Ron Goldman whom she had met some six weeks prior to their deaths. Brown's sister Denise described this period in a 1994 interview, saying that Nicole "was just so vivacious, so full of life" and "I was so happy for her. For the first time in her life, she was able to have her own friends. We were talking about going to Yosemite, camping, taking the kids to Club Med. Everything was going to revolve around the kids."

== Murder ==
=== Final days ===
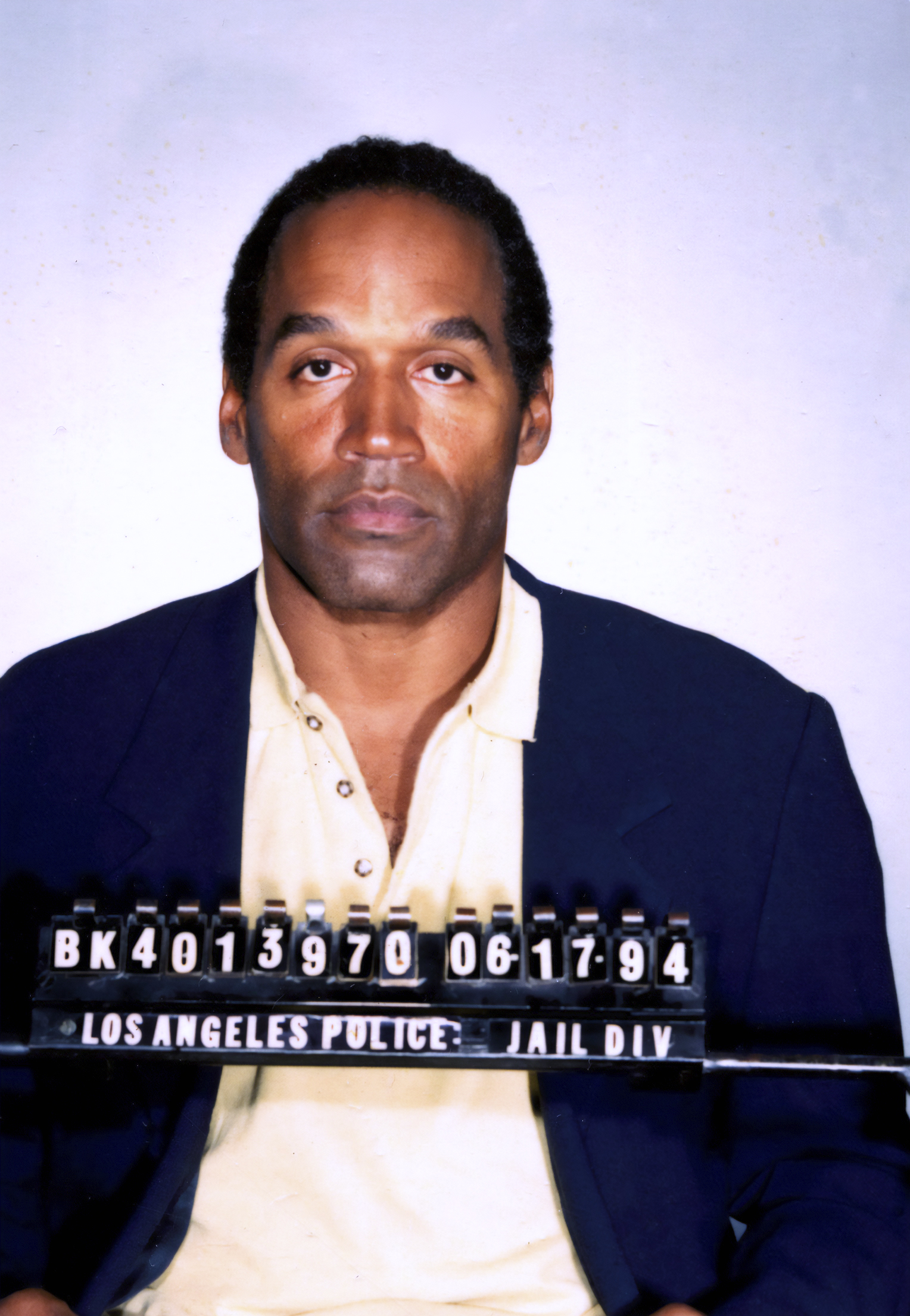
Simpson's mugshot, June 17, 1994

On March 16, 1994, Brown and her children attended the premiere for Simpson's newest film, Naked Gun 33⅓: The Final Insult.

Brown met 25-year-old restaurant waiter Ron Goldman six weeks prior to their deaths. According to police and friends, they had a platonic relationship, occasionally meeting for coffee and dinner. Goldman borrowed her Ferrari when he met a friend for lunch. The friend, Craig Clark, stated that Goldman told him it was his friend Nicole's car.

Brown developed pneumonia in May and Simpson came to her house to care for her. Simpson left for Palm Springs Memorial Day weekend 1994. Just one day before the murders, Brown and her close friend Kris Jenner spoke on the phone, making plans to go to lunch the next day. Kris said in an interview that Nicole wanted to confide in her about something "very important" and possibly reveal information about her "volatile" relationship with Simpson, but Brown was murdered before they could meet. According to Brown’s sister Tanya, Nicole told their mother Juditha on the night she was murdered while they were eating dinner at the Mezzaluna restaurant that Simpson would always be her soul mate.

=== June 12, 1994 ===
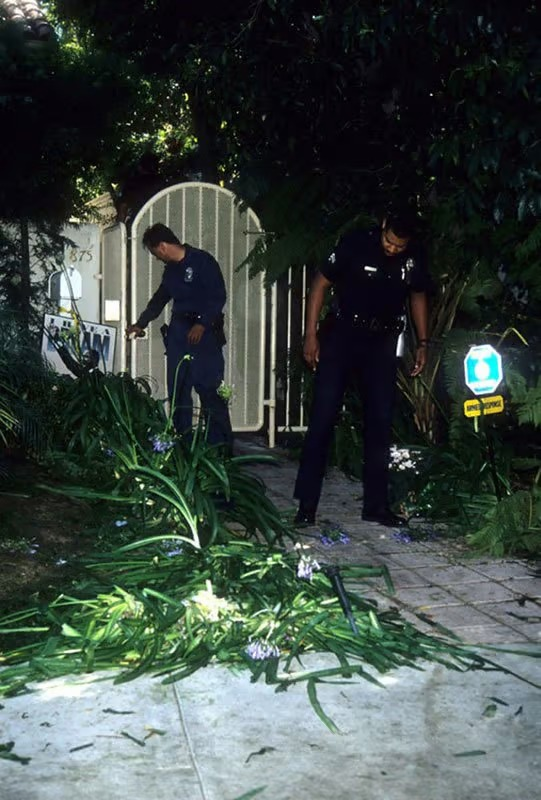
Police officers searching Brown's condo for evidence in June 1994

At the time of her death, Brown resided at 875 South Bundy Drive in Brentwood, Los Angeles, California, with her two children. On the evening of June 12, Brown took Sydney and a friend out to dinner after the children's dance recital. The defense team would cite that Brown had an intense argument on the phone, overheard by eight-year-old Sydney upstairs, and that a witness named Tom Lang saw Brown arguing with two men in the area of the sidewalk near the front of her house shortly after 10:00 that night. Brown's mother, Juditha, told police and investigators in a sworn statement that she was speaking with her daughter on the telephone at 11:00pm that night. Those phone records were sealed.

Brown and Goldman were stabbed to death outside her home; their bodies were found shortly after midnight. Brown was lying in the fetal position in a pool of blood. An autopsy determined that she had been stabbed seven times in the neck and scalp and had sustained a 14 cm-long (5.5 inches) gash across her throat, which had severed both her left and right carotid arteries and breached her right and left jugular veins. The wound on Brown's neck penetrated 1.9 cm (0.75 inches) into her cervical vertebrae, nearly decapitating her. She also had defensive wounds on her hands.

During a reconstruction of events, the police theorized that Brown and Goldman were talking on the front patio of Brown's condominium when they were attacked or that Goldman arrived while Brown was being attacked; in any case, the police believe that Brown was the intended target and that Goldman was killed in order to silence him. Witness Robert Heidstra testified that while walking near Brown's condominium that night, he heard a man yelling, "Hey! Hey! Hey!" who was then shouted at by a second man. He also heard a gate slam. Goldman's family came to believe that Goldman was the man shouting "Hey!" and that he may have attempted to save Brown by intervening in the attack.

Brown's funeral was held on June 16 at the St. Martin of Tours Catholic Church in Brentwood, with mourners including Simpson and their two children, members of Brown's family, Al Cowlings, Kato Kaelin, and Steve Garvey. Brown is buried in Ascension Cemetery in Lake Forest, California.

== Trials ==
=== Criminal trial ===
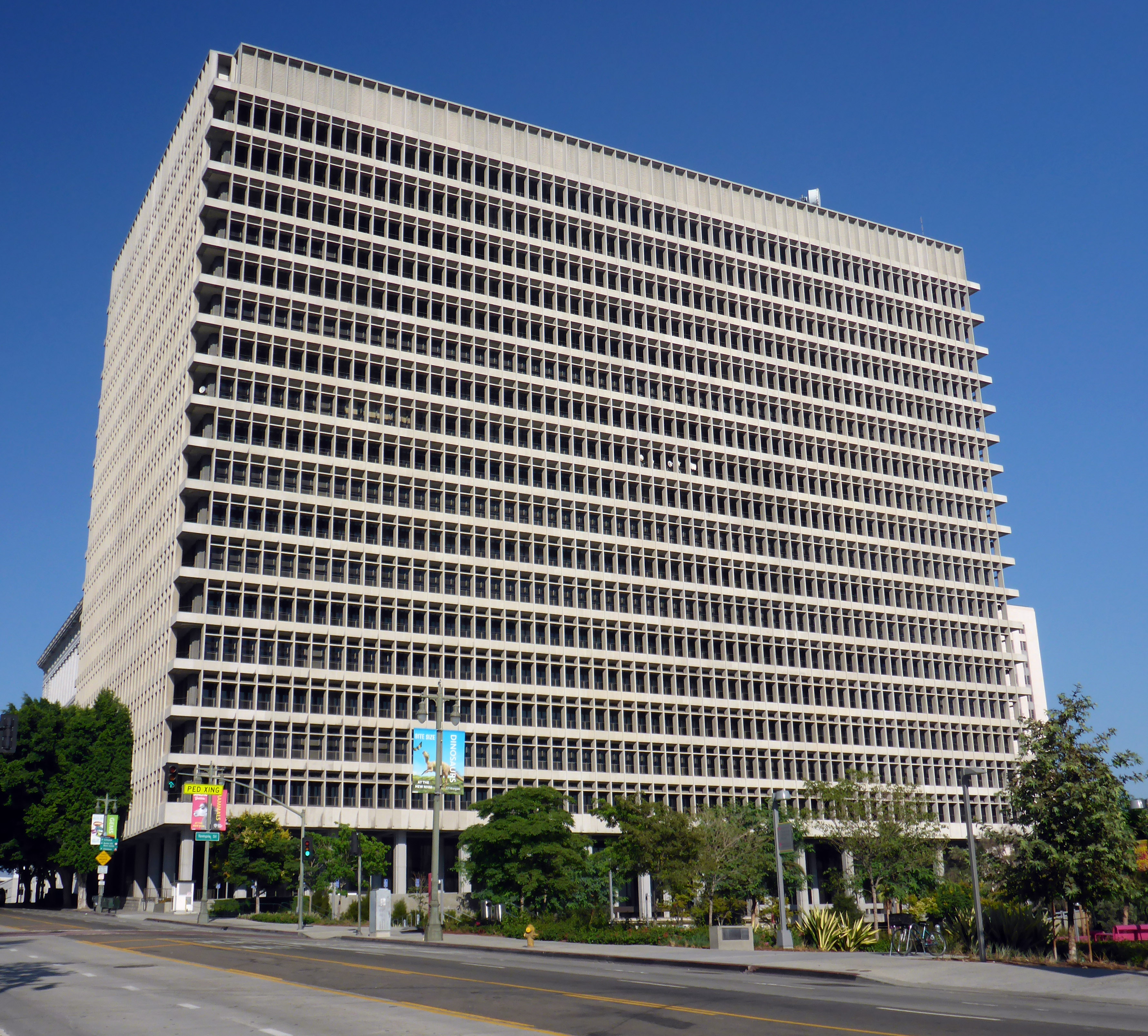
The Clara Shortridge Foltz Criminal Justice Center, where the trial took place

After leading police on a low-speed chase in a now infamous white Ford Bronco, Simpson was tried for the murders of Brown and Goldman. The trial spanned eight months, from January 24 to October 3, 1995, and received international publicity and exacerbated racial divisions in the U.S. During the trial, there was some speculation as to whether Brown and Goldman were secretly dating, compounded by three facts, that Brown was wearing a slinky, revealing cocktail dress when she was found dead, candles were lit in the master bedroom and bathroom, and the master bathroom’s tub was full of water.

Though prosecutors argued that Simpson was implicated by a significant amount of forensic evidence, he was acquitted of both murders on October 3. Commentators agree that to convince the jury to acquit Simpson, the defense capitalized on anger among the city's African-American community toward the Los Angeles Police Department (LAPD), which had a history of racial bias and had inflamed racial tensions in the beating of Rodney King and subsequent riots two years prior. The trial is often characterized as the trial of the century because of its international publicity and has been described as the "most publicized" criminal trial in history. Simpson was formally charged with the murders on June 17; when he did not turn himself in at the agreed time, he became the subject of a police pursuit. TV stations interrupted coverage of the 1994 NBA Finals to broadcast live coverage of the pursuit, which was watched by around 95 million people. The pursuit and Simpson's arrest were among the most widely publicized events in history.

Simpson was represented by a high-profile defense team, referred to as the "Dream Team", initially led by Robert Shapiro and subsequently directed by Johnnie Cochran. The team included F. Lee Bailey, Alan Dershowitz, Robert Kardashian, Shawn Holley, Carl E. Douglas, and Gerald Uelmen. Simpson was also instrumental in his own defense. While Deputy District Attorneys Marcia Clark, William Hodgman, and Christopher Darden believed they had a strong case, the defense team persuaded the jury there was reasonable doubt concerning the DNA evidence. They contended the blood sample had been mishandled by lab scientists and that the case had been tainted by LAPD misconduct related to racism and incompetence. The use of DNA evidence in trials was relatively new, and many laypersons did not understand how to evaluate it. The defense retained renowned advocate for victims of domestic abuse Lenore E. Walker. Cochran said that she would testify that Simpson does not fit the profile of an abuser that would murder his spouse; "He has good control over his impulses. He appears to control his emotions well." Brown's friend, Cora Fischman, testified that Brown never said anything to her about being abused by Simpson during the months leading up to the murders.

The trial was considered significant for the wide division in reaction to the verdict. Observers' opinions of the verdict were largely related to their ethnicity; the media dubbed this the "racial gap". A poll of Los Angeles County residents showed most African Americans thought the "not guilty" verdict was justified while most whites thought it was a racially motivated jury nullification by the mostly African-American jury. Polling in later years showed the gap had narrowed since the trial; more than half of polled Black respondents expressed the belief that Simpson was guilty. In 2017, three jurors who acquitted Simpson said they would still vote to acquit, while one said he would convict.

In the 1996 book Killing Time: The First Full Investigation into the Unsolved Murders of Nicole Brown Simpson and Ronald Goldman, authors Donald Freed and Raymond P. Briggs wrote that lipstick was found on Goldman's cheek after his death, and suggested that Brown kissed Goldman when he arrived and that they were together on the front porch when they were attacked.

=== Civil trial ===
In 1996, Fred Goldman and Sharon Rufo (Ron Goldman's parents) and Lou Brown (Nicole Brown's father) filed a civil suit against Simpson for wrongful death. Presiding Judge Hiroshi Fujisaki did not allow the trial to be televised, did not sequester the jury, and prohibited the defense from alleging racism by the LAPD and from condemning the crime lab. There was no change to the physical evidence, but additional evidence of domestic violence was presented, as well as 31 pre-1994 photos of Simpson wearing Bruno Magli shoes, including one that was published six months before the murders, proving it could not be a forgery.

One significant difference between the two trials was the admission of Brown's diary entries in the civil case. Lead counsel Daniel Petrocelli explained, "The least explored aspect of the case is Simpson's motive. You cannot just say this murder was a culmination of domestic-violence incidents. You need to tell the jury a story. This was about a stormy relationship." Time magazine reported, "That strategy made the difference in understanding Simpson... Nicole's diary showed that she and Simpson were having fights in those last weeks. Their hostilities had taken a cruel turn. Simpson sent Nicole a letter that was a thinly veiled threat to report her to the IRS for failing to pay capital-gains taxes. Infuriated, she started to deny him access to the children.... She began to treat him like a stranger. That, Petrocelli said, is when three weeks of retaliation began. In that period, the lawyer argued, Simpson grew angrier and more obsessed with his ex-wife, developing a rage that resulted in death for her and Ron Goldman."

The civil judge found the diary entries admissible because they were pertinent to Nicole's state of mind, which in turn was relevant to Simpson's motive—reversing a crucial ruling from the criminal case that excluded the diary as "inadmissible hearsay". The civil court's ruling was upheld on appeal. The jury found Simpson liable for the murders and awarded the victims' families $33.5 million in compensation and punitive damages. Simpson filed for bankruptcy afterwards and relocated to Florida to protect his pension from seizure. His remaining assets were seized and auctioned off, most being purchased by critics of the criminal trial verdict to help the plaintiffs recoup the costs of litigation. Simpson's Heisman Trophy was sold for $255,500 to an undisclosed buyer. All the proceeds went to the Goldman family, who said they have received only one percent of the money that Simpson owes from the wrongful death suit.

Following Simpson's acquittal, no additional arrests or convictions related to the murders were made. Simpson maintained his innocence in subsequent media interviews. He was subsequently jailed for an unrelated armed robbery at a Las Vegas hotel in 2008. In July 2017 after Simpson was granted parole, Ron Goldman’s father Fred inquired about the real estate purchases made by Sydney and Justin Simpson, Brown’s children with Simpson. David Cook, a lawyer for Fred Goldman, said he would seek bank records and depositions to follow the kids’ money trail and see if any of the homes were bought with their dad’s cash, which could make them eligible for a clawback. “The kids’ loss is no greater than Fred’s, but Fred’s loss should be no greater than theirs,” Cook said. Following Simpson's death in 2024, his estate lawyer Malcolm LeVergne pledged to prevent the Brown and Goldman families from obtaining the money promised in the civil trial judgement, but later reversed course.

=== Custody of children ===
After Brown's death and Simpson's arrest, Brown's parents temporary received custody of Sydney and Justin. In 1996, after the conclusion of the criminal trial, a judge granted Simpson's petition to return to him full custody of Sydney and Justin. Brown's parents continued unsuccessfully to fight for custody until 2006, when Justin turned 18 and legally became an adult. Sydney turned 18 in 2003.

=== Alternate theories and suspects ===
While defense attorney F. Lee Bailey and several members of Simpson's family still advocated for Simpson's innocence, such theories have been rejected by prosecutors, witnesses, and the families of Brown and Goldman, who have expressed the belief that Simpson committed the murders and was the sole perpetrator. Alternative theories have been suggested, such as that Simpson may have had accomplices in the murders, or that he was not involved at all and was framed. Several speculate that the murders were related to the Los Angeles drug trade and the murders of Michael Nigg and Brett Cantor.

The 2000 BBC TV documentary, O.J.: The True Untold Story, primarily rehashes the contamination and blood planting claims from the trial and asserted that Simpson's elder son Jason is a possible suspect, due to—among other reasons—Simpson hiring defense attorneys for his children first before himself, pictures of Jason's descriptive wool cap, and an alleged prior arrangement to meet with Brown that evening. William Dear published his findings in the book O.J. Is Innocent and I Can Prove It.

A 2012 documentary entitled My Brother the Serial Killer examined the crimes of convicted murderer Glen Edward Rogers and included claims that Rogers had killed Brown and Goldman in California in 1994. According to Rogers's brother Clay, Rogers claimed that before the murders, he had met Brown and was "going to take her down." During a lengthy correspondence that began in 2009 between Rogers and criminal profiler Anthony Meoli, Rogers wrote and created paintings about his involvement with the murders. During a prison meeting between the two, Rogers claimed Simpson hired him to break into Brown's house and steal some expensive jewelry. He said that Simpson had told him, "You may have to kill the bitch". In a filmed interview, Rogers's brother Clay asserts that his brother confessed his involvement. Rogers's family stated that he had informed them that he had been working for Brown in 1994 and that he had made verbal threats about her to them. Rogers later spoke to a criminal profiler about the murders, providing details about the crime and remarking that he had been hired by Simpson to steal a pair of earrings and potentially murder Brown. LAPD responded to the documentary as follows, "We know who killed Nicole Brown Simpson and Ron Goldman. We have no reason to believe that Mr. Rogers was involved." Fred Goldman, father of Ron Goldman stated, "The overwhelming evidence at the criminal trial proved that one, and only one, person murdered Nicole Brown Simpson and Ronald Goldman. That person is O.J. Simpson and not Glen Rogers."

== Legacy ==
=== Foundation ===
The Nicole Brown Simpson Foundation was established in 1994 in Brown's memory. Later renamed the Nicole Brown Charitable Foundation, it reportedly cut back on grantmaking in 1999 due to a drop in donations and questionable management practices.

=== Tributes ===
In a rare 1996 VHS video by her parents called A Tribute to Nicole, Brown is described as having had a "happy childhood" growing up in a "close family" and as "lov[ing] interior decorating." Clips from the family's home movies show her as a young girl playing with stuffed animals, swimming in a pool, dancing, carrying school books, and blowing out birthday candles on cupcakes. She was characterized by her mother as "warm", "wonderful", and "free-spirited".

R&B group H-Town dedicated their 1997 album Ladies Edition, Woman's World to Brown and "all the women of the world" for what they felt were grievous transgressions in attitude towards women on the part of the hip-hop world.

Kato Kaelin described Brown in a 2024 interview as a "beautiful" friend who was a "beacon of light, always bright, always fun". Kris Jenner said Brown was "one of [her] best friends" with whom she often took family vacations. Jenner also shared memories of a Los Angeles restaurant she used to frequent with Brown and their mutual friend, Faye Resnick.

Brown's sister, Tanya Brown, said in a 2019 interview that "Nicole was a mom: she put her kids first, she put everybody else first. My sister had the ability to live life, live it bright, live it large." That same year, Tanya wrote an article claiming that she had forgiven Simpson, despite believing him responsible for her sister's murder.

Kris Jenner named her fourth daughter, Kendall Nicole Jenner, after Brown. Kendall was born 17 months after Brown's death.

When filmmaker Ezra Edelman, director of the documentary O.J.: Made in America, won the Academy Award for Best Documentary Feature, he dedicated the award to both Brown and Goldman in his acceptance speech.

=== Death of parents ===
On July 3, 2014, Brown's father, Louis Hezekiah "Lou" Brown Jr., died aged 90. He was interred next to Nicole in Ascension Cemetery in Lake Forest, California. Nicole's headstone had space for an additional inscription, so it was altered to include her father.

On November 8, 2020, Brown's mother, Juditha Anne "Judi" Baur Brown, died aged 89. She was interred in Ascension Cemetery next to her husband and daughter. Nicole's original headstone was replaced by a larger one that included the inscriptions for both of her parents on it.

=== Property ===
Two years after the deaths of Brown and Goldman, the townhouse at 875 South Bundy Drive was extensively remodeled by a new owner, who also had the address changed.

== Media ==
=== Book ===
"Nicole. Jesus. I looked down and saw her on the ground in front of me, curled up in a fetal position at the base of the stairs, not moving. Goldman was only a few feet away, slumped against the bars of the fence. He wasn't moving either. Both he and Nicole were lying in giant pools of blood. I had never seen so much blood in my life. It didn't seem real, and none of it computed."

— If I Did It: Confessions of the Killer, Simpson (2006), p. 81.

Simpson authored a book with ghostwriter Pablo Fenjves, who was also a prosecution witness in Simpson’s 1995 murder trial, titled If I Did It, which is a first-person account of how he would have carried out the murders if he had committed them. In Simpson's hypothetical scenario, he has an unwilling accomplice named "Charlie" who urges him to not engage with Brown, whom Simpson plans to "scare the shit out of". Simpson ignores Charlie's advice and continues to Brown's condo, where he finds and confronts Ron Goldman. According to the book, Brown falls and hits her head on the concrete, and Goldman crouches in a karate pose. As the confrontation escalates, Simpson writes, "Then something went horribly wrong, and I know what happened, but I can't tell you how." He writes that he regained consciousness later with no memory of the actual act of murder.

Simpson's eldest daughter, Arnelle Simpson, testified in a deposition that she and Van Exel, president of Raffles Entertainment and Music Production, came up with the idea for the book and pitched it to her father in an attempt to make money. She testified that her father thought about it and eventually agreed to the book deal. Simpson stated, "I have nothing to confess. This was an opportunity for my kids to get their financial legacy. My kids understand. I made it clear that it's blood money, but it's no different than any of the other writers who did books on this case."

According to court documents, in August 2007, as part of the multi-million dollar civil jury award against Simpson to ensure he could not profit from the book, the Goldman family were granted the proceeds from the book. The Goldman family still own the copyright, media rights, and movie rights, and they have acquired Simpson's name, likeness, life story, and right of publicity in connection with the book. After changing the title to If I Did It: Confessions of the Killer, the Goldman family had the book published in September 2007 through Beaufort Books. Denise Brown, Nicole Brown's sister, criticized the Goldmans for publishing the book and accused them of profiting from Brown and Goldman's deaths.

Raging Heart: The Intimate Story of the Tragic Marriage of O.J. and Nicole Brown Simpson by Sheila Weller covers Brown’s marriage to Simpson and the events leading up to her murder featuring interviews with her friends and family.

Feminist writer Andrea Dworkin wrote several essays about Brown and her domestic abuse and murder for the Los Angeles Times. Dworkin later compiled these essays and published them in her 1997 book Life and Death: Unapologetic Writings on the Continuing War Against Women.

=== Portrayals ===
Brown was portrayed by Jessica Tuck in the 1995 television movie The O. J. Simpson Story; by Kelly Dowdle in the 2016 Netflix series The People v. O. J. Simpson: American Crime Story; by Mena Suvari in the 2019 film The Murder of Nicole Brown Simpson; and by Charlotte Kirk in the upcoming film The Juice.

=== Podcast ===
The podcast You're Wrong About did multiple episodes covering Brown’s life and her relationship with Simpson, with the intention of drawing attention to the abuse that she experienced, as well as the events leading up to her murder and the trial.

=== Documentary ===
Upon Simpson's death in 2024, Lifetime announced that a two-part documentary about Brown was in development, titled The Life and Murder of Nicole Brown Simpson, which aired on June 1 and 2, 2024.

Final 24 produced an episode covering the last 24 hours of Brown’s life featuring interviews with her sister Tanya, friends David LeBon and Ron Hardy, her therapist Susan Forward, and LAPD detective Tom Lange.

== See also ==
- Domestic violence in the United States
- Violence Against Women Act
- List of unsolved murders (1980–1999)
