= O.J.: Made in America =

2016 American documentary

- Television release poster
- Directed by: Ezra Edelman
- Produced by: Ezra Edelman; Caroline Waterlow; Tamara Rosenberg; Nina Krstic; Deirdre Fenton; Libby Geist; Erin Leyden; Connor Schell
- Cinematography: Nick Higgins
- Edited by: Bret Granato; Maya Mumma; Ben Sozanski
- Music by: Gary Lionelli
- Production companies: ESPN Films; Laylow Films
- Distributed by: Walt Disney Studios Motion Pictures
- Release dates: January 22, 2016 (Sundance); May 20, 2016 (United States)
- Running time: 467 minutes
- Country: United States
- Language: English
- Budget: $5 million

O.J.: Made in America is a 2016 American documentary, produced and directed by Ezra Edelman for ESPN Films and their 30 for 30 series. It was released as a five-part miniseries and in theatrical format. O.J.: Made in America premiered at the Sundance Film Festival on January 22, 2016, and was theatrically released in New York City and Los Angeles in May 2016 by Walt Disney Studios Motion Pictures. It debuted on ABC on June 11, 2016, and aired on ESPN.

The documentary explores race and celebrity through the life of O. J. Simpson, from his emerging football career at the University of Southern California, and his celebrity and popularity within American culture, to his trial for the murders of Nicole Brown Simpson and Ronald Lyle Goldman, and subsequent acquittal, and how he was convicted and imprisoned for the Las Vegas robbery 13 years later.

The documentary received critical acclaim and won the Academy Award for Best Documentary Feature at the 89th Academy Awards. It was the longest film in the 30 for 30 catalogue and longest film to ever receive an Oscar nomination and win (surpassing the War and Peace film series). The documentary became the last of its type to be nominated and win an Oscar after a new Academy rule barred any "multi-part or limited series" from being eligible for the documentary categories. Edelman received the Primetime Emmy Award for Outstanding Directing for Nonfiction Programming for his work on this project. The series also received a Peabody Award for its work.

== Premise ==
Through interviews, news footage, and archival audio and video, O.J.: Made in America traces the life and career of O. J. Simpson, starting with his arrival at the University of Southern California as an emerging football superstar and ending with his incarceration in 2007 for robbery. Throughout the documentary, Simpson's life – the football success, television and acting career, relationship with Nicole Brown, the domestic abuse, Nicole and Ron Goldman's murder, the trial – runs parallel to the larger narrative of the city of Los Angeles, which serves as host to mounting racial tensions, and a volatile relationship between the city's police department and the African-American community. Footage from the Watts riots was used as well as the entire Rodney King video, which most news outlets and documentaries only used in parts. Both of these events are used to set up and explain what happened during the Simpson murder trial.

Television critic James Poniewozik described the director's technique in his New York Times review: "Ezra Edelman pulls back, way back, like a news chopper over a freeway chase. Before you hear about the trial, the documentary says, you need to hear all the stories – the stories of race, celebrity, sports, America – that it's a part of."

== Production ==
Development of a documentary based on Simpson for ESPN Films began in 2007, eventually leading to the hiring of Brett Morgen to create the film, June 17th, 1994, also part of the 30 for 30 series. Released in June 2010, June 17th, 1994 used solely archive footage from several sporting events that occurred on June 17, 1994, to chronicle the events of the police chase of O. J. Simpson. ESPN Films executive producer Connor Schell said, "If you are going to do O.J. Simpson, you are going to cover June 1994 to Oct. 1995 – it is unavoidable. But if you are interested in things that came before it and after it, then it has to be longer than the traditional two-hour form." This led to a meeting between Schell and director Ezra Edelman in February 2014, where Schell expressed interest in creating a five-hour documentary on Simpson. Edelman initially declined, as he felt "there was nothing left to say about him". Edelman eventually agreed to the project, realizing that Simpson's trial did not have to be the focus, or if he was innocent or guilty, rather, Edelman "could use that canvas to tell a deeper story about race in America, about the city of Los Angeles, the relationship between the black community and the police, and who O.J. was and his rise to celebrity. That's the story I wanted to tell." According to Edelman, Made in America was inspired by the "sweeping historical documentaries" of Ken Burns and the 2004 French documentary miniseries The Staircase.

Throughout the 18-month process from conception to completion, Edelman conducted 72 interviews for the documentary, "including key players from the prosecution (Marcia Clark, Gil Garcetti and Bill Hodgman), Simpson's defense team (F. Lee Bailey, Carl E. Douglas and Barry Scheck), childhood friends of Simpson (Joe Bell and Calvin Tennyson), relatives of Simpson (cousin Dwight Tucker), fellow football players (Jim Brown and Earl Edwards), jurors from the criminal trial (Carrie Bess and Yolanda Crawford), former LAPD detectives involved in the case (Mark Fuhrman and Tom Lange) and African-American civil rights activists (Dr. Harry Edwards, Danny Bakewell and Cecil Murray)", and people who could speak on behalf of Ron Goldman (his father Fred Goldman) and Nicole Brown Simpson (her sister Tanya Brown, her friends David LeBon and Robin Greer, and her boyfriend Keith Zlomsowitch). Also interviewed were people connected to Simpson such as his agent Mike Gilbert along with Tom Riccio and Bruce Fromong, who were each involved parties of the 2007 robbery.

Edelman also reached out to Simpson through a letter, which was never answered; he had also hoped to include Simpson's first wife, Marguerite L. Whitley, who could not be contacted, and former L.A. County district attorney Christopher Darden, who declined participation. (He would later appear in the 2025 Netflix docuseries American Manhunt: O.J. Simpson). Despite envisioning the project as a five-hour documentary, the final film was screened to ESPN Films executives at 7.5 hours in length, to which Schell said they would figure out the programming end, as they were "going to give Ezra the time he needs to tell this story". The initial plan was to break the film into three parts – "everything leading up to the murder and then the trial and then everything after the trial" – before a five-part format was settled on. In January 2016, ESPN Films announced O.J.: Made in America for part of their 30 for 30 series.

== Release ==
O.J.: Made in America premiered at the Sundance Film Festival on January 22, 2016, with one intermission, and was also screened at the Tribeca Film Festival on April 23, 2016, and the Hot Docs Canadian International Documentary Festival in Toronto on April 29 and 30. The documentary had a theatrical run with two intermissions at Cinema Village in New York City and the Laemmle Theatre in Santa Monica, California from May 20–26, 2016. The first part debuted on television on June 11, 2016, on ABC, followed by parts two through five airing on ESPN on June 14, 15, 17 and 18, respectively. The entire documentary was made available on WatchESPN on June 14, 2016, after the airing of the second part. In subsequent airings of the fourth part, graphic crime scene photos were blurred by ESPN, to allow the re-airings to occur "at various times." The images were not blurred in the original airing or in the version available "on demand to viewers online or via cable VOD services."

== Reception and legacy ==
It was met with acclaim by arts and cultural commentators unfamiliar with ESPN's programming.

On review aggregator website Rotten Tomatoes, the film has an approval rating of 100%, based on 56 reviews, with an average rating of 9.3/10. The site's critical consensus reads, "O.J.: Made in America paints a balanced and thorough portrait of the American dream juxtaposed with tragedy and executed with power and skill." On Metacritic, which assigns a weighted average rating to reviews, the film has a score of 96 out of 100, based on 21 critics, indicating "universal acclaim".

Kenneth Turan and Mary McNamara of the Los Angeles Times both praised O.J.: Made in America, with Turan stating, the film "is an exceptional 7 1/2-hour documentary, so perceptive, empathetic and compelling you want it never to end", with McNamara adding, "Historically meticulous, thematically compelling and deeply human, O.J.: Made in America is a masterwork of scholarship, journalism and cinematic art." Sports Illustrated's Richard Deitsch called the film "the best 30 for 30 documentary [ESPN] has ever produced. It is thrilling and uncompromising filmmaking... and it will make you look at the most famous murder case in United States history with fresh eyes and under a larger prism." Brian Tallerico, writing for RogerEbert.com, awarded the film four stars out of four, stating, "Even in this era of 'Peak TV', it's rare to see something as essential and momentous as ESPN's OJ: Made in America... Ezra Edelman's stunningly ambitious, eight-hour documentary is a masterpiece, a refined piece of investigative journalism that places the subject it illuminates into the broader context of the end of the 20th century... I would have watched it for another eight hours... It's that good."

Daniel Feinberg of The Hollywood Reporter said, "O.J.: Made in America is a provocative, intelligent and thorough documentary that tears along at an impressive clip given its length, with tragedy around every corner. The first miniseries to air under the ESPN Films and 30 for 30 banners, it also instantly takes its place among the banner's best efforts", while Hank Stuever for The Washington Post called it "nothing short of a towering achievement". Variety's Brian Lowry added, "even in the annals of ESPN's 30 for 30 docs, [Ezra Edelman has created] what feels like a master opus – one that deals with the nexus of race, celebrity and sports, and the strange juxtaposition of a figure who prided himself on transcending color, yet ultimately relied upon it when charged with the murder of his ex-wife, Nicole, and Ronald Goldman."

A.O. Scott of The New York Times felt the film "has the grandeur and authority of the best long-form nonfiction. If it were a book, it could sit on the shelf alongside The Executioner's Song by Norman Mailer and the great biographical works of Robert Caro. It's very much a film, though, a feat of tireless research, dogged interviewing and skillful editing." However, Scott felt a "significant blind spot" for the film was its "predominance of male voices among the interview subjects, and the narrowness of the film's discussion of domestic violence... [T]he film, which so persuasively treats law enforcement racism as a systemic problem, can't figure out how to treat violence against women with the same kind of rigor or nuance", adding that "O.J. Simpson is viewed as a symbol" while "Nicole Brown Simpson's fate, in contrast, is treated as an individual tragedy, and there seems to be no political vocabulary available to the filmmakers to understand what happened to her. The deep links between misogyny and American sports culture remain unexamined."

O.J.: Made in America was noted for presenting the claim that Simpson stopped taking his arthritis medicine so the gloves wouldn’t fit him in court. However Johnnie Cochran denied this during the trial and informed Judge Ito in court that Shawn Chapman contacted the Los Angeles County Jail doctor, who confirmed Simpson was taking his arthritis medication every day, and that the jail's medical records verified this.

Ishmael Reed was interviewed by director Ezra Edelman for O.J.: Made in America, however his interview wasn't used in the documentary. Reed was harshly critical of the documentary in an article he wrote for the magazine CounterPunch, stating that, “In the series, other prosecutors yammered on and on about theories that were disproven in court. A detective who might have planted evidence was allowed to take up time. In order to make the case that the decision in the criminal trial was based on black grievances about the LAPD, or Mark Fuhrman, they used a black juror whose opinion fit this marketable line instead of jurors who voted on the basis of evidence that had been tampered with. The late Philip Vannatter never explained why he carried a vial of the victim’s blood to O.J.’s estate.” Reed lamented his interview wasn’t used "because it would have disturbed this entertainment that was meant to comfort a white audience into believing that all of the questions about the Brentwood murders have been answered... That’s why it faithfully supported the line of the prosecutors and the police, regardless of whether O.J. is guilty or innocent of the Brentwood murders.”

It was voted #81 on BBC's 100 Greatest Television Series of the 21st Century.

In July 2025, it ranked number 11 on Rolling Stone's list of "The 100 Best Movies of the 21st Century."

=== Accolades ===
Award	Date of ceremony	Category	Recipient(s)	Result	Ref.
Academy Awards	February 26, 2017	Best Documentary Feature	Ezra Edelman and Caroline Waterlow	Won	
ACE Eddie Awards	January 27, 2017	Best Edited Documentary Feature	Bret Granato, Maya Mumma and Ben Sozanski	Won	
Alliance of Women Film Journalists	December 21, 2016	Best Documentary	Ezra Edelman	Nominated	
American Film Institute Awards	January 6, 2017	AFI Special Award	O.J.: Made in America	Won	
Austin Film Critics Association	December 28, 2016	Best Documentary	O.J.: Made in America	Nominated	
Black Reel Awards	February 16, 2017	Best Feature Documentary	Ezra Edelman	Nominated	
Black Reel Awards	February 16, 2017	Outstanding Emerging Filmmaker	Ezra Edelman	Won	
Boston Society of Film Critics	December 11, 2016	Best Documentary Film	O.J.: Made in America	Won	
Chicago Film Critics Association	December 15, 2016	Best Documentary	O.J.: Made in America	Won	
Cinema Audio Society	February 18, 2017	Outstanding Achievement in Sound Mixing for a Motion Picture – Documentary	Keith Hodne and Eric Di Stefano	Nominated	
Cinema Eye Honors	January 11, 2017	Outstanding Achievement in Nonfiction Feature Filmmaking	Ezra Edelman and Caroline Waterlow	Nominated	
Cinema Eye Honors	January 11, 2017	Outstanding Achievement in Direction	Ezra Edelman	Won	
Cinema Eye Honors	January 11, 2017	Outstanding Achievement in Editing	Bret Granato, Maya Mumma, and Ben Sozanski	Nominated	
Cinema Eye Honors	January 11, 2017	Outstanding Achievement in Production	Ezra Edelman and Caroline Waterlow	Won	
Cinema Eye Honors	January 11, 2017	Outstanding Achievement in Original Music Score	Gary Lionelli	Nominated	
Critics' Choice Documentary Awards	November 3, 2016	Best Documentary Feature	O.J.: Made in America	Won	
Critics' Choice Documentary Awards	November 3, 2016	Best Director (Theatrical Feature)	Ezra Edelman	Won	
Critics' Choice Documentary Awards	November 3, 2016	Best Sports Documentary	O.J.: Made in America	Won	
Critics' Choice Documentary Awards	November 3, 2016	Best Limited Documentary Series	O.J.: Made in America	Won	
Critics' Choice Documentary Awards	November 3, 2016	Best Political Documentary	O.J.: Made in America	Nominated	
Detroit Film Critics Society	December 19, 2016	Best Documentary Film	O.J.: Made in America	Won	
Directors Guild of America Awards	February 4, 2017	Outstanding Directorial Achievement in Documentary	Ezra Edelman	Won	
Florida Film Critics Circle	December 23, 2016	Best Documentary	O.J.: Made in America	Runner-up	
Dorian Awards	January 26, 2017	Documentary of the Year	O.J.: Made in America	Won	
Georgia Film Critics Association	January 13, 2017	Best Documentary Film	O.J.: Made in America	Won	
Georgia Film Critics Association	January 13, 2017	Best Picture	O.J.: Made in America	Nominated	
Gotham Awards	November 28, 2016	Best Documentary	Ezra Edelman, Caroline Waterlow, Tamara Rosenberg, Nina Krstic, Deirdre Fenton, Libby Geist, Erin Leyden, and Connor Schell	Won	
Gotham Awards	November 28, 2016	Audience Award	Ezra Edelman, Caroline Waterlow, Tamara Rosenberg, Nina Krstic, Deirdre Fenton, Libby Geist, Erin Leyden, and Connor Schell	Nominated	
Houston Film Critics Society	January 6, 2017	Best Documentary Feature	O.J.: Made in America	Won	
Independent Spirit Awards	February 25, 2017	Best Documentary Feature	Ezra Edelman	Won	
IndieWire Critics Poll	December 2016	Best Documentary	O.J.: Made in America	Won	
IndieWire Critics Poll	December 2016	Best Editing	Bret Granato, Maya Mumma and Ben Sozanski	Runner-up	
IndieWire Critics Poll	December 2016	Best Film	O.J.: Made in America	5th Place	
International Cinephile Society	February 19, 2017	Best Documentary	O.J.: Made in America	Nominated	
International Documentary Association	December 9, 2016	Best Feature	Ezra Edelman, Caroline Waterlow, Tamara Rosenberg, Nina Krstic, Deirdre Fenton, Libby Geist, Erin Leyden, and Connor Schell	Won	
Los Angeles Film Critics Association	December 4, 2016	Best Editing	Bret Granato, Maya Mumma, and Ben Sozanski	Won	
Los Angeles Film Critics Association	December 4, 2016	Best Documentary Film	O.J.: Made in America	Runner-up	
MTV Movie & TV Awards	May 7, 2017	Best Documentary	O.J.: Made in America	Nominated	
National Board of Review	November 29, 2016	Best Documentary Film	O.J.: Made in America	Won	
National Society of Film Critics	January 7, 2017	Best Non-Fiction Film	O.J.: Made in America	Won	
New York Film Critics Circle	January 3, 2017	Best Non-Fiction Film	O.J.: Made in America	Won	
New York Film Critics Online	December 11, 2016	Top Films of the Year	O.J.: Made in America	Won	
Online Film Critics Society	January 3, 2017	Best Documentary Film	O.J.: Made in America	Won	
Online Film Critics Society	January 3, 2017	Best Picture	O.J.: Made in America	Nominated	
Peabody Awards	May 20, 2017	Documentary	ESPN Films and Laylow Films	Won	
Philadelphia Film Festival	October 20–30, 2016	Audience Award	O.J.: Made in America	Won	
Primetime Emmy Awards	September 17, 2017	Exceptional Merit in Documentary Filmmaking	Ezra Edelman, Caroline Waterlow, Tamara Rosenberg, Nina Krstic, Libby Geist, and Connor Schell	Nominated	
Primetime Emmy Awards	September 17, 2017	Outstanding Directing for Nonfiction Programming	Ezra Edelman (Episode: "Part 3")	Won	
Primetime Emmy Awards	September 17, 2017	Outstanding Cinematography for a Nonfiction Program	Nick Higgins (Episode: "Part 4")	Nominated	
Primetime Emmy Awards	September 17, 2017	Outstanding Picture Editing for a Nonfiction Program	Bret Granato, Maya Mumma and Ben Sozanski (Episode: "Part 4")	Won	
Primetime Emmy Awards	September 17, 2017	Outstanding Music Composition for a Limited Series, Movie, or Special	Gary Lionelli (Episode: "Part 2")	Nominated	
Primetime Emmy Awards	September 17, 2017	Outstanding Sound Mixing for a Nonfiction Program	Keith Hodne and Eric Di Stefano (Episode: "Part 2")	Nominated	
Producers Guild of America Awards	January 28, 2017	Outstanding Producer of Documentary Theatrical Motion Pictures	Ezra Edelman and Caroline Waterlow	Won	
San Diego Film Critics Society	December 12, 2016	Best Documentary	O.J.: Made in America	Nominated	
San Francisco Film Critics Circle	December 11, 2016	Best Documentary Film	O.J.: Made in America	Nominated	
Satellite Awards	February 19, 2017	Best Documentary Film	O.J.: Made in America	Nominated	
Seattle Film Critics Society	January 5, 2017	Best Documentary	Ezra Edelman	Won	
TCA Awards	August 5, 2017	Outstanding Achievement in News and Information	O.J.: Made in America	Won	
Vancouver Film Critics Circle	January 9, 2017	Best Documentary	O.J.: Made in America	Nominated	
Village Voice Film Poll	December 2016	Best Documentary	O.J.: Made in America	Won	
Village Voice Film Poll	December 2016	Best Film	O.J.: Made in America	5th Place	
Washington D.C. Area Film Critics Association	December 5, 2016	Best Documentary	O.J.: Made in America	Nominated	

== See also ==
- American Manhunt: O.J. Simpson
- List of American football films
- List of longest films
- True crime
