= American Manhunt: O.J. Simpson =

- Series cover art
- Based on: Murder trial of O. J. Simpson
- Directed by: Floyd Russ
- Music by: Victor Magro
- Country of origin: United States
- Original language: English
- No. of episodes: 4

Production
- Producers: Floyd Russ; Ali Brown; Aaron L. Ginsburg; William Green; Tiller Russell
- Cinematography: Ayinde Anderson
- Editors: David Tillman; Patrick Nelson Barnes; Will Butler
- Production company: Netflix

Original release
- Network: Netflix
- Release: January 29, 2025

American Manhunt: O.J. Simpson is a four-part documentary series and the second installment of the American Manhunt series of documentaries directed by Floyd Russ and released on January 29, 2025, on Netflix. The series covers the 1995 murder trial and acquittal of O. J. Simpson, where he was accused of the murders of his ex-wife Nicole Brown Simpson and Ron Goldman.

The series features new interviews with prosecutor Christopher Darden, detective Mark Fuhrman, defense attorney Carl Douglas, Ron Goldman's sister, and others. Two witnesses that were not called to present evidence in the murder trial were also interviewed.

The series introduced new evidence that was found at Simpson's house on the night of the murders, including damp clothing in a washing machine, an opened first-aid kit, and an empty knife box found in a bathroom.

Director Floyd Russ stated that Simpson was invited to be interviewed for the series, but wanted significant payment and control over the production. These requests were considered unethical and denied.

== Viewership ==
According to data from Showlabs, American Manhunt: OJ Simpson ranked sixth on Netflix in the United States during the week of 27 January–2 February 2025.

== See also ==
- O.J.: Made in America
