= Robert Shapiro =

Robert Shapiro may refer to:

== People ==
- Robert Shapiro (chemist) (1935–2011), American professor emeritus of chemistry at New York University
- Robert Shapiro (filmmaker), American film producer
- Robert Shapiro (lawyer) (born 1942), American civil litigator
- Robert B. Shapiro (1938–2025), American businessman, CEO of Monsanto
- Robert H. Shapiro (1935–2004), American chemist and Dean of United States Naval Academy
- Robert H. Shapiro, former CEO of Florida-based Woodbridge Securities, currently serving a 25 year sentence for running a Ponzi scheme
- Robert J. Shapiro (born 1953), American economist
- Robert Y. Shapiro, American political scientist

== Fictional characters ==
- Robert "Robbie" Shapiro, a character in Nickelodeon's teen sitcom Victorious
