= Killing of Michael Nigg =

Unsolved 1995 killing in Los Angeles possibly connected to O.J. Simpson case

Michael Nigg
- An undated photograph of Nigg
- Born: April 28, 1969; Gunnison, Colorado, US
- Died: September 8, 1995 (aged 26); Hollywood, California, US
- Cause of death: Homicide by gunshot wound
- Occupations: Waiter, actor, model

Michael Nigg (April 28, 1969 – September 8, 1995) was an American man who worked as a waiter at a Beverly Hills restaurant. He was shot and killed during an apparent robbery attempt in Hollywood. The Los Angeles Police Department later arrested three suspects but soon released them for lack of evidence. No other suspects have ever been identified, and the killing remains unsolved.

The case attracted some media coverage at the time, because Nigg had formerly worked at the Mezzaluna restaurant in Brentwood, where he had befriended Ronald Goldman. Almost 15 months earlier, Goldman and Nicole Brown Simpson had been found slain at her home near the restaurant, after he had gone there to return her mother's eyeglasses, which had been left behind at Mezzaluna. Simpson's ex-husband, former football star O. J. Simpson, had been charged with the murders, and his highly publicized trial had reached closing arguments.

Simpson, who consistently professed his innocence in the Brown and Goldman killings, was acquitted of the murder charges almost a month after Nigg's death. (Note: He was later found liable in the deaths in a civil suit brought by the Brown and Goldman families.) Alternative theories of the murders, supposedly shared by Simpson, have suggested they were related to drug trafficking in the Los Angeles area, and that Nigg's was as well; Nigg apparently lived very well for a waiter, and there were some allegations he too had been involved in the drug trade while working at the Mezzaluna branch in Colorado before. It has also been noted that Nigg and Goldman were not the only waiters at Mezzaluna to be the victims of criminal activity during the mid-1990s.

== Background ==
Nigg was born in Gunnison, Colorado, where he grew up and attended Western State University. After graduating, he went to the Los Angeles area to try to start an acting or modeling career. He made an appearance on Liars, a syndicated television series.

While seeking jobs and roles, he worked at restaurants waiting tables to support himself. By 1994, he was working at the Mezzaluna restaurant in Brentwood, on the city's Westside. Among his friends and coworkers there was Ronald Goldman. Nigg worked there until a month before June 1994, when Goldman was murdered along with Nicole Brown Simpson, former wife of football star O. J. Simpson. As Simpson's trial for the killings progressed, Nigg went to work at another restaurant, Sanctuary, located in Hollywood.

== Crime and investigation ==
On the evening of September 8, 1995, Nigg and his girlfriend Julie Long were driving to a restaurant in his Mercedes on a dinner date. Nigg stopped at a bank branch on Beverly Boulevard to withdraw some money from his account. Long stayed in the car, parked in the branch's parking lot, while Nigg walked to an ATM, to withdraw $40.

As he finished the transaction, two robbers walked up from the darkness and confronted him, demanding money. When he refused, a struggle ensued and one of the men shot Nigg in the head. Both robbers fled the scene empty handed, departing in a waiting car. Long, who witnessed the entire incident, was not harmed. The killers did not appear to have taken anything despite their initial aims.

The crime was reported promptly. The Los Angeles Police Department (LAPD) looked for the suspects over the weekend but found no leads. On the night after the killing, Nigg's friends gathered in the parking lot for a candlelight vigil. Among them was actor Mickey Rourke, who spoke to television news crews that came to cover the event. "If anyone knows anything about the shooting that took place," he said, "just give the cops a call."

Three months later the LAPD arrested three suspects, including the alleged getaway driver. However, they were quickly released for lack of evidence. Rewards have been offered, and the killing was dramatized on a January 1996 episode of Season Nine of FOX's America's Most Wanted. The case remains open and unsolved.

== Possible connection to O. J. Simpson murder case ==
The Los Angeles County District Attorney's office prosecuted Simpson for the killings of Goldman and Simpson's ex-wife, Nicole Brown Simpson, based on the theory that Simpson, who had a history of domestic violence with her, had acted in a fit of rage upon realizing that she was not going to return to him. Simpson, according to his lawyers, believed that the two had been killed over their involvement in drug dealing in the area, and that other murders at the time were carried out for the same reason. He speculated that Nicole had been planning to open a restaurant of her own using proceeds from cocaine sales. Mezzaluna Trattoria, where she ate her last meal, and where both Nigg and Goldman had worked, was reportedly a nexus for drug trafficking in Brentwood.

Authors Donald Freed and Raymond Briggs claimed in Killing Time (1996), their book about the Simpson case, that an unnamed source told them that while Nigg had lived in Colorado, he was known to law enforcement there to be "involved in the narcotics culture" in Aspen (where another branch of Mezzaluna is located) and Denver. According to journalist Joseph Bosco, who had a reserved seat at the entire trial, Nigg "lived beyond his apparent means", driving a Mercedes and living in a luxury condominium while ostensibly deriving most of his income from waiting tables and occasional low-level acting jobs. Freed and Briggs, among others, have also observed that the circumstances of the killing seem to suggest the assailants' true intent was to kill Nigg rather than rob him. Moreover, Nigg and Goldman were not the only Mezzaluna waiters who had fallen victim to foul play around that time: two others were missing, and a third had his car destroyed by fire in Corona del Mar in 1994.

== See also ==
- Brett Cantor, Hollywood nightclub owner whose unsolved 1993 stabbing death was also seen by Simpson's defense as possibly related to the two killings he was charged with
- Crime in Los Angeles
- List of unsolved murders (1980–1999)
