= My Brother the Serial Killer =

- Directed by: David Monaghan
- Based on: Crimes of serial killer Glen Rogers
- Produced by: David Monaghan; John Terp
- Starring: Anthony Meoli as profiler
- Narrated by: Clay Rogers
- Cinematography: Craig Evans; Harry Frith
- Edited by: Murray North
- Music by: Davey Ray Moor
- Distributed by: Investigation Discovery
- Release date: November 21, 2012 (U.S.)
- Running time: 90 minutes
- Country: United States
- Language: English

My Brother the Serial Killer is a 2012 American television documentary about serial killer Glen Rogers, also known as the "Cross Country Killer”, who was convicted of two murders, armed robbery and arson in the 1990s, in Florida and California. He is suspected of committing additional murders in Mississippi and Louisiana.

The documentary was narrated by Rogers' brother Clay Rogers and aired on Investigation Discovery in November 2012. My Brother the Serial Killer received widespread media attention for Clay's claims that his brother had said he had committed the 1994 murders of Nicole Brown Simpson and Ron Goldman in California.

== Synopsis ==
My Brother the Serial Killer chronicles Rogers's background and looks into his prior assertions that he had murdered more than 70 people. As it investigates claims by the Rogers family that Glen Rogers committed the Goldman-Simpson murders, the documentary includes a filmed interview of Glen's brother Clay. He asserts that Rogers had confessed his involvement. Rogers' family stated that he had informed them that he had been working for Nicole in 1994 and that he had made verbal threats about her to them. Rogers would later speak to criminal profiler Anthony Meoli about the Goldman-Simpson murders, providing details about the crime and remarking that he had been hired by O. J. Simpson to steal a pair of earrings and potentially murder Nicole.

In his years-long correspondence (beginning in 2009) with Meolis, Rogers wrote about and created paintings pointing towards his involvement with the murders. During a personal prison meeting between the two, Rogers said he was hired by O.J. Simpson to break into Brown's house and steal some expensive jewelry, and that Simpson had told him: "you may have to kill the bitch". As it investigates claims by the Rogers family that Glen Rogers was behind the Goldman-Simpson murders, the documentary includes a filmed interview of Glen's brother Clay, wherein Clay asserts that his brother confessed his involvement.

== Reception ==
=== Reaction from Goldman and Brown families ===
The families of Nicole Simpson and Ron Goldman expressed anger at the documentary's premise, with both families dismissing the claims by the Rogers family. Kim Goldman accused Investigation Discovery of irresponsibility, also saying that no one had informed her of Rogers' claims that he had been involved in her brother's death.

Investigation Discovery's president Henry Schlieff replied that the documentary's intention was not to prove that Rogers had committed the crimes but to "give viewers new facts and let them make up their own minds". He said that he believed that Simpson was guilty of the murders. Schlieff also said that the movie did not point out any inconsistencies with the claims or evidence against Rogers because "ID viewers are savvy enough to root them out on their own."

=== Critical response ===
Variety gave My Brother the Serial Killer a positive review, praising the documentary for "eschewing cheesy shock effects in favor of incisive commentary from family, law enforcement, press and even victims' friends". IndieWire criticized the documentary as not making much sense and for using the viewpoint of Clay Rogers rather than of someone more distanced from Rogers or the crime.
