= Robert Kardashian =

American attorney and businessman (1944–2003)

- Born: Robert George Kardashian; February 22, 1944; Los Angeles, California, U.S.
- Died: September 30, 2003 (aged 59); Los Angeles, California, U.S.
- Resting place: Inglewood Park Cemetery
- Education: University of Southern California (BS); University of San Diego (JD)
- Known for: O. J. Simpson murder case
- Spouses: Kris Houghton (m. 1978; div. 1991); Jan Ashley (m. 1998; ann. 1999); Ellen Pierson (m. 2003)
- Children: Kourtney; Kim; Khloé; Rob
- Family: Kardashian

Robert George Kardashian (February 22, 1944 – September 30, 2003) was an American attorney and businessman. Patriarch of the Kardashian family of prominent entertainers, he gained national recognition as O. J. Simpson's friend and defense attorney during Simpson's 1995 murder trial.

== Early life and education ==
Robert George Kardashian was born on February 22, 1944, in Los Angeles, California, one of three children born to Arthur Kardashian and Helen Jean Arakelian Kardashian, both Armenian Americans. He had a sister, Barbara Kardashian Freeman, and a brother, Thomas "Tom" Kardashian. The Kardashians were Armenian Spiritual Christians originally from Kars Oblast, and known by the surname Kardaschoff, a Russianized form of the Armenian surname Kardashian, as the area, though now part of modern-day Turkey, was then part of the Russian Empire. Once in the United States, Arthur's father, Tatos, changed his name to Thomas, and began a career in garbage collection, founding his own business, and married Hamas Shakarian, also an immigrant of Armenian heritage.

He grew up in the affluent View Park area of Los Angeles County, where the family lived at 4908 Valley Ridge Avenue. Kardashian attended Susan Miller Dorsey High School and the University of Southern California, from which he graduated in 1966 with a B.S. degree in business administration. He earned a J.D. degree from the University of San Diego School of Law and practiced for about a decade; after that, he went into business. In 1973, Kardashian was one of the co-founders of the trade publication Radio & Records, which he and his partners sold for a large profit in 1979. Kardashian also pioneered the idea of playing music between movies in theaters. He subsequently parlayed the concept into a business, starting a company called Movie Tunes. He served as president and CEO of the firm and later invested in Juice Inc., a frozen yogurt company, and in a music video business called Concert Cinema.

== O. J. Simpson case ==
Kardashian and Simpson first met around 1967 while both of them were at USC and became close friends. Simpson was the best man at Kardashian and Kris Houghton's wedding in 1978.

Following the June 12, 1994, murder of Nicole Brown Simpson and Ronald Goldman, Simpson stayed in Kardashian's house to avoid the media. Kardashian was the man seen carrying Simpson's garment bag the day that Simpson flew back from Chicago. Prosecutors speculated that the bag may have contained Simpson's bloody clothes or the murder weapon. When Simpson failed to turn himself in at 11 a.m. on June 17, 1994, Kardashian read a letter by Simpson to the assembled media. This letter was interpreted by many as a suicide note.

Simpson was charged with the murders and subsequently acquitted of all criminal charges in a controversial criminal trial. Kardashian had let his license to practice law become inactive before the Simpson case but reactivated it to aid in Simpson's defense as a volunteer assistant on his legal team, alongside Simpson's main defense attorneys, Robert Shapiro and Johnnie Cochran. As one of Simpson's lawyers and a member of the defense "Dream Team", Kardashian could not be compelled or subpoenaed to testify against Simpson in the case, which included Simpson's past history and behavior with his ex-wife Nicole, and as to the contents of Simpson's garment bag. He sat by Simpson throughout the trial.

The New York Times reported that Kardashian said in a 1996 ABC interview with Barbara Walters that he had begun to question Simpson's innocence: "I have doubts. The blood evidence is the biggest thorn in my side; that causes me the greatest problems. So I struggle with the blood evidence." After Simpson's acquittal, Kardashian and Simpson ultimately stopped speaking to each other. He also stated that had he known his family would get death threats, he would have never taken OJ's case.

== Illness and death ==
Kardashian was diagnosed with esophageal cancer in July 2003. He died two months later, on September 30, 2003, at his home in Encino, Los Angeles, at age 59, and was buried at Inglewood Park Cemetery in Inglewood, California.

== In popular culture ==
Kardashian was portrayed by David Schwimmer in the 2016 FX miniseries American Crime Story: The People v. O. J. Simpson. Schwimmer was nominated for the Primetime Emmy Award for Outstanding Supporting Actor in a Limited Series or Movie for his performance, but lost to Sterling K. Brown, who portrayed Christopher Darden in the same series. In 2016, ESPN Films and their 30 for 30 series produced a five-part miniseries called O.J.: Made in America, produced by Ezra Edelman, in which Kardashian was featured heavily through archive footage.

In 2017, Kardashian was the subject of the pilot episode of the TV comedy series Over My Dead Body on Amazon Prime.

== Personal life ==
Kardashian dated Priscilla Presley from 1975 to 1976. The pair met through Kardashian's older brother, Tom Kardashian, who was dating Joan Esposito, the former wife of Joe Esposito, road manager for Elvis. On an episode of Keeping Up with the Kardashians, his daughter Kim stated that the two were briefly engaged.

Kardashian married former flight attendant Kris Kardashian (née Houghton, later Jenner) on July 8, 1978. They had four children: daughters Kourtney (born 1979), Kim (born 1980), Khloé (born 1984), and son Rob (born 1987). Kardashian filed for divorce in 1990 due to his wife's infidelity. Their divorce was finalized in March 1991, but they remained friends until his death.

Shortly after separating from his first wife in 1991, Kardashian became engaged to Denice Shakarian Halicki, his third cousin and the widow of movie producer H.B. Halicki. The couple never married and eventually broke up.

In 1998, Kardashian married Jan Ashley; however, the marriage ended in annulment in 1999. Ashley later claimed frequent upset and turmoil related to Kardashian's ex-wife, Kris, and their children "were instrumental" in the demise of the relationship.

After dating for three years and proposing in 2001, Kardashian married his third wife, Ellen Pierson (née Markowitz), six weeks prior to his death.

Kardashian–Jenner family tree

Robert Kardashian	Kris Houghton	Caitlyn Jenner
Kourtney Kardashian	Travis Barker	Kim Kardashian	Kanye West	Khloé Kardashian	Tristan Thompson	Rob Kardashian	Blac Chyna	Kendall Jenner	Kylie Jenner
North West

== See also ==
- Kardashian family
- History of the Armenian Americans in Los Angeles
