= Robert Shapiro (lawyer) =

American attorney and entrepreneur (born 1942)

- Born: Robert Leslie Shapiro; September 2, 1942 (age 84); Plainfield, New Jersey, U.S.
- Education: University of California, Los Angeles (BS); Loyola Marymount University (JD)
- Spouse: Linell Thomas (m. 1970)
- Children: 2

Robert Leslie Shapiro (born September 2, 1942) is an American attorney and entrepreneur. He is best known for being the short-term defense lawyer of Erik Menendez in 1990, and a member of the "Dream Team" of O. J. Simpson's attorneys that successfully defended him from the charges that he murdered his ex-wife, Nicole Brown Simpson, and Ron Goldman, in 1994. He later turned to civil work and co-founded ShoeDazzle and LegalZoom, appearing in their television commercials.

== Early life and education ==
Shapiro was born in Plainfield, New Jersey, to a Jewish family. He graduated from Hamilton High School in Los Angeles in 1961 and UCLA in 1965, with a B.S. in Finance. He obtained his Juris Doctor from Loyola Law School in 1968. At UCLA, he pledged the Jewish fraternity Zeta Beta Tau with his best friend, Roger Cossack.

== Legal practice and books about the law ==
Shapiro was admitted to the State Bar of California in 1969. He has represented famous athletes, most notably O. J. Simpson, Darryl Strawberry, José Canseco, and Vince Coleman. In 1998, he sued Strawberry over unpaid legal fees; the case was eventually settled out of court. Shapiro has also represented celebrities, his clients including Johnny Carson, Christian Brando, Linda Lovelace, F. Lee Bailey, and the Kardashian family.

In the case of Lyle and Erik Menendez, who murdered their parents in 1989, Shapiro arranged the surrender of Erik in 1990, who at the time of Lyle's arrest was in Israel for a tennis tournament. He later represented Erik during their first arraignment, until the defense was handed over to Leslie Abramson, who represented Erik until the brothers' conviction in 1996.

Shapiro played a crucial role in the O. J. Simpson murder case. Already associated with Simpson, on June 17, 1994, he was present at Robert Kardashian's press conference pleading for Simpson to turn himself in to the police. According to Shapiro, Simpson's psychiatrists agreed that his letter to "friends", which Kardashian read over the air, was a suicide note. On television, Shapiro appealed to Simpson to surrender. Later that day, after the famous low-speed "Bronco chase", Simpson surrendered to the police, with Shapiro's assistance.

When the actual trial began, Shapiro led the defense team (dubbed the "Dream Team"), but later ceded lead chair to Johnnie Cochran. Despite their team's success in freeing Simpson, Shapiro criticized his fellow Dream Team attorneys F. Lee Bailey (calling him a "loose cannon") and Cochran, for bringing race into the trial. In his book The Search for Justice: A Defense Attorney's Brief on the O.J. Simpson Case (1998), Shapiro states that he does not believe Simpson was framed by the LAPD but does believe the verdict was correct due to reasonable doubt. Shortly after the Simpson trial, Shapiro steered his practice away from criminal defense toward civil litigation.

Shapiro was sued by record producer Phil Spector for refusing to return a $1 million retainer for legal services. Spector ultimately settled the lawsuit against Shapiro for an undisclosed amount.

On April 30, 2007, Shapiro was the subject of a published appellate opinion involving allegations that he had forwarded a request from his client to the client's CEO to remove twelve duffel bags, each containing $500,000 in cash, from the client's apartment, prior to a judge's order freezing the client's assets. In that opinion the California Court of Appeal held that Shapiro's law firm, Christensen Miller Fink Jacobs Glaser Weil & Shapiro LLP, could be held liable for his alleged misconduct, even though Shapiro holds no equity interest in the firm and is not a true partner. Ultimately, Shapiro settled the case for $450,000 (nearly twice the amount he said he was paid to represent the client in the first place), without admitting any wrongdoing.

Shapiro has represented Steve Wynn and Wynn Resorts, actress Eva Longoria, Rob Kardashian (in the 2017 revenge porn case brought by Blac Chyna), Occidental Petroleum Corporation, Rockstar, and Diamond Resorts International. Shapiro represented the colorful Malibu psychiatrist and stem cell marketeer William C. Rader before the Medical Board of California, in an unsuccessful attempt to prevent the permanent revocation of Rader's medical license.

Shapiro frequently writes about the law and has published multiple books on the subject. In 2013, The National Law Journal named him on the list of the 100 Most Influential Lawyers in America. Shapiro has also been recognized among the "500 Leading Lawyers in America," by Lawdragon in 2023 and has been consistently named to Southern California Super Lawyers for decades.

=== Children's book ===
Shapiro created Somo the Sober Monkey, a character in the children's book Somo Says No, which has an anti-drug theme. It is made available to schools free of charge.

=== Business ventures ===
Shapiro is the cofounder of LegalZoom and ShoeDazzle.

== Personal life ==
Shapiro married Linell Thomas on March 8, 1970. They had two sons, Grant and Brent.

After his son Brent's death from a drug overdose in 2005, he founded the Brent Shapiro Foundation, a nonprofit organization with an aim to raise drug awareness, for which he serves as chairman of the board, as well as Pickford Lofts, a rehabilitation facility. Through the Brent Shapiro Foundation, high school kids who enter into after-school activities through Brent's Club who stay sober can receive college scholarships through the Foundation.

== Portrayals in films and television ==
Shapiro is known as a "celebrity" lawyer and as such, is a celebrity himself. He has appeared as himself (or as a lawyer resembling his real life self) in a number of films and television series, including the film Havoc (2005). He has also been portrayed by actors in film dramatizations of the O.J. Simpson murder trial.

- Bruce Weitz portrayed Shapiro in the Fox TV movie The O. J. Simpson Story (1995).
- Ron Silver portrayed Shapiro in the CBS TV miniseries American Tragedy (2000).
- John Travolta portrayed Shapiro in the FX cable TV miniseries American Crime Story: The People v. O.J. Simpson (2016). Though Travolta's performance was met with mixed reviews, he was nominated for the Primetime Emmy Award for Outstanding Supporting Actor in a Limited Series or Movie, which he lost to his co-star Sterling K. Brown, who portrayed Christopher Darden. As one of the producers, however, Travolta won the Primetime Emmy Award for Outstanding Limited Series.
- Douglas Olsson portrayed Shapiro in the NBC miniseries Law & Order: True Crime - The Menendez Murders (2017). Olsson appeared in the second episode as Erik Menendez's lawyer who surrendered him to the LAPD from Israel. Shapiro was then mentioned several times by Erik Menendez in the seventh episode during a conversation with O. J. Simpson.
- Salvator Xuereb portrayed Shapiro in an episode of the Netflix limited series Monsters: The Lyle and Erik Menendez Story (2024).
- Himself in An Alan Smithee Film: Burn Hollywood Burn (1997)
