= Rob Kardashian =

American television personality (born 1987)

- Born: Robert Arthur Kardashian; March 17, 1987 (age 39); Los Angeles, California, U.S.
- Education: University of Southern California Marshall School of Business (BBA)
- Occupations: Television personality; businessman; fashion designer
- Years active: 2007–present
- Television: Keeping Up with the Kardashians; Rob & Chyna
- Children: 1
- Parents: Kris Jenner; Robert Kardashian
- Relatives: Kardashian family

Robert Arthur Kardashian (born March 17, 1987) is an American television personality. He is known for appearing on Keeping Up with the Kardashians, a reality television series that centers on his family, as well as its spin-offs. In 2011, Kardashian also competed in the thirteenth season of ABC's Dancing with the Stars, during which he placed second. He is the fourth and youngest child and the only son of Robert Kardashian and Kris Jenner.

== Early life ==
Robert Arthur Kardashian was born March 17, 1987 in Los Angeles, California, to attorney Robert Kardashian and wife Kris. He has three older sisters, Kourtney, Kim, and Khloé. He is the fourth and youngest child and the only son of Robert Kardashian and Kris Jenner. His parents divorced in 1991, and his mother married Olympic decathlete Caitlyn Jenner (Note: Jenner's name changed from Bruce to Caitlyn during a gender transition in 2015.) the same year. Through their marriage, Kardashian gained step-brothers Burt, Brandon, and Brody; step-sister Casey; and half-sisters Kendall and Kylie Jenner. His father, Robert Kardashian, died in September 2003 from esophageal cancer.

Kardashian graduated from the University of Southern California's Marshall School of Business in 2009.

== Career ==
Kardashian was a contestant on season 13 of Dancing with the Stars in 2011. He was paired with two-time champion Cheryl Burke and made it further than his sister Kim did during her appearance in the seventh season. Kardashian was almost eliminated in the fourth week. During the season, Kardashian became the most improved dancer, advancing with his partner Cheryl Burke to the finals, her fifth time doing so. The pair ended up in second place against J.R. Martinez and Karina Smirnoff.

Kardashian has also taken on several business ventures working with PerfectSkin, Rival Spot, the BG5 and working on his own sock line. Kardashian was one of the final judges of Miss USA 2012.

Kardashian announced in August 2012 that he would return to the University of Southern California and study law later in the year. USC's Gould School of Law, however, denied this, and stated via its Twitter account that Kardashian had not even applied to the school.

In 2012, Kardashian participated in Fox's dating game show The Choice. That same year, he launched his sock line titled Arthur George.

The reality series Rob & Chyna premiered on September 11, 2016. It followed Kardashian's relationship with model Blac Chyna as they prepared to welcome their first child. Six hour-long episodes were ordered, excluding a television special featuring the birth of Kardashian and Chyna's newborn. The show concluded that December.

== Personal life ==
Kardashian dated actress Adrienne Bailon from 2007 until 2009. Their relationship was documented on the family reality show Keeping Up with the Kardashians. In 2012, he dated singer Rita Ora.

In December 2015, it was reported that Kardashian was hospitalized after falling ill and diagnosed with diabetes.

In January 2016, Kardashian began dating model Blac Chyna. On April 5, 2016, Kardashian and Chyna announced their engagement via Instagram after three months of dating. In May 2016, it was reported that the couple were expecting their first child together. Their daughter, Dream Renée Kardashian, was born on November 10, 2016. On December 17, 2016, the couple announced their split on social media after Chyna's Instagram account was hacked. Kardashian told his Snapchat followers that his fiancée left him, moved out of their home and took their month-old daughter with her. However, the couple reconciled as the split was revealed to be done in the "heat of the moment." On December 28, 2016, Kardashian was hospitalized again for diabetes, however, he left the hospital the next day.

On July 5, 2017, Kardashian made a series of Instagram posts accusing Chyna of infidelity and posted explicit pictures of her. He was later banned from Instagram for posting revenge porn, but an official account managed by Jenner Communications is active.

== Notes ==
Awards and achievements
Preceded by Kirstie Alley & Maksim Chmerkovskiy	Dancing with the Stars (US) runner up Season 13 (Fall 2011 with Cheryl Burke)	Succeeded by Katherine Jenkins & Mark Ballas
