= William Hodgman (prosecutor) =

American lawyer and prosecutor (born 1952)

- Born: December 14, 1952 (age 73); La Habra, California, U.S.
- Education: University of California, Los Angeles (BA); University of California, Hastings (JD)
- Occupations: Attorney, prosecutor
- Years active: 1978–present
- Children: 1

William Hodgman (born December 14, 1952) is an American lawyer and prosecutor. He served as a prosecutor during the O. J. Simpson murder trial, a role in which he gained international attention. He also served as the Assistant District Attorney for line operations in the Los Angeles District Attorney's office.

== Early life ==
Hodgman was born and raised in La Habra, California, a suburban community in southern California. He is the oldest of four children. He graduated from the University of California, Los Angeles and then the University of California, Hastings College of the Law in 1978.

== Career ==
Upon graduation from law school, Hodgman started his career as a junior prosecutor in the Los Angeles District Attorney's office. He was officially hired by Johnnie Cochran, who was the Assistant District Attorney of Los Angeles, at the time. In 1982, Hodgman left the Los Angeles District Attorney's office to work in private practice at a local law firm. However, after just one year, he returned to the District Attorney's office.

Hodgman was the lead attorney in the prosecution of Charles Keating, who was convicted for fraud. As a result of his work, he was awarded with the 1992 Outstanding Prosecutor of the Year by the California District Attorneys Association and the Los Angeles County Association of Deputy District Attorneys. In 1993, Hodgman led the investigation into the child sexual abuse accusations against Michael Jackson.

Hodgman was assigned to be a co-prosecutor in the O.J. Simpson murder trial and was present during opening statements. However, during a meeting with other prosecutors, he began to suffer from chest pains and collapsed. Hodgman was rushed to the hospital and his condition was attributed to stress from his case. Testing at the hospital also revealed that he had a chronic heart defect. Hodgman did not return to the O.J. Simpson trial and was replaced by Chris Darden as the co-prosecutor.

Hodgman successfully prosecuted record label owner Suge Knight for a probation violation in 1997.

Hodgman served as the Assistant District Attorney for line operations in the Los Angeles District Attorney's office until 2019 when he retired after 40 years working with the Los Angeles District Attorney's office.

He also made an appearance in Ezra Edelman's documentary OJ Made In America. He was critical of lawyer Johnnie Cochran and reflected on the acquittal. Footage shows he was in court to hear the 1995 acquittal.

== In popular culture ==
Hodgman is played by Christian Clemenson in the 2016 television series The People v. O. J. Simpson: American Crime Story.

== Personal life ==
Hodgman is married and has a son.
