= Shawn Holley =

American defense attorney

- Born: Shawn Katherine Chapman
- Other name: Shawn Chapman Holley
- Education: University of California, Los Angeles (BA); Southwestern Law School (JD)
- Years active: 1988–present
- Spouse: Dorian Holley

Shawn Katherine Chapman Holley is an American defense attorney.

== Early life and education ==
Holley was raised in Los Angeles. Her mother was a legal secretary who earned an M.B.A. through night classes and became the manager of a prestigious law firm. Though Holley spent many hours at her mother's law firm, she was uninterested in the law until she met "a cool lawyer who did work that excited her". She enrolled in law school and one summer took a law clerk position at the public defenders office which included interviewing people who had been detained.

The experience was a revelation. "The holding cell is packed with people," Holley recalls. "Packed! Everybody is black or brown. I was like, 'I don’t understand—how is it that only black or brown men have committed crimes?'

Holley graduated from University of California at Los Angeles with a B.A. in English in 1984, and from Southwestern Law School with a J.D. in 1988.

== Career ==
Holley began her career in the Los Angeles County Public Defender's Office where she worked for five years before being hired by Johnnie Cochran. She eventually became the Managing Partner of The Cochran Firm, and was a member of O. J. Simpson's legal defense team, dubbed the "Dream Team".

Holley is a partner at the firm Kinsella Weitzman Iser Kump Holley LLP, practicing in various areas of litigation. Having joined the firm in 2006, it was renamed to include her name in 2021.

She has represented a number of celebrity clients, including Kim Kardashian, Tupac Shakur, Snoop Dogg, Paris Hilton, Nicole Richie, Lindsay Lohan, Trevor Bauer, and Danny Masterson.

Holley was chief legal correspondent for the E! Network, as well as an on-air legal analyst for KABC Eyewitness News in Los Angeles. She has appeared on the Today Show, Good Morning America, PrimeTime Live, Court TV, Fox News and CNN. Additionally Holley is a visiting faculty lecturer at Benjamin N. Cardozo Law School at Yeshiva University in New York City.

In 2018, Holley was added to the Board of Trustees of Southwestern Law School.

== Popular culture ==
In the 2016 FX miniseries, The People v. O. J. Simpson, Holley was portrayed by Angel Parker.

The character "Jax" in the 2022 TV series Reasonable Doubt is loosely based on the experiences of Shawn Holley, who is also a producer for the show.

== Personal life ==
Her husband is musician Dorian Holley. They have three children Nayanna, Sasha and Olivia.
