= Gerald Uelmen =

American attorney (born 1940)

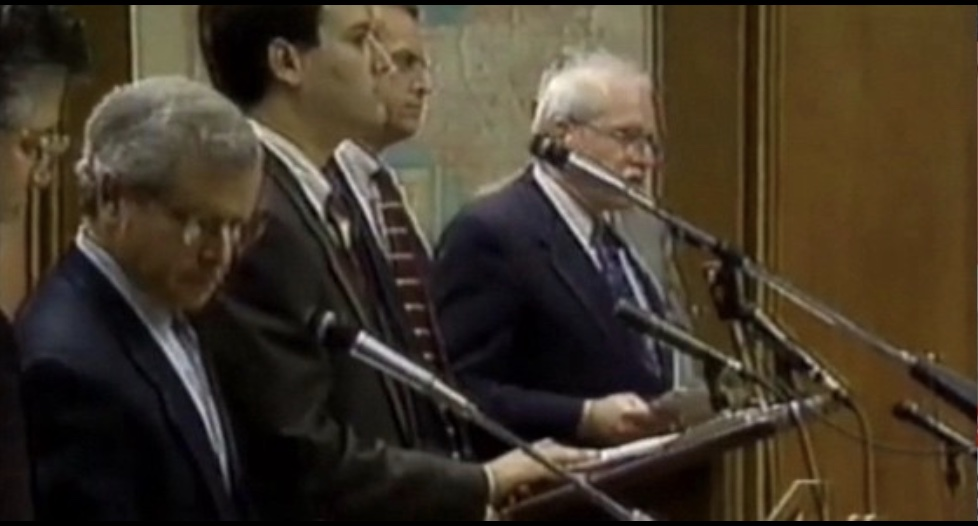
- Uelmen in O.J. Simpson civil case
- Born: October 8, 1940 (age 86); Greendale, Wisconsin, U.S.
- Education: Loyola Marymount University (BA); Georgetown University (JD, LLM)

Gerald F. Uelmen (born October 8, 1940) is an American attorney, writer, civil servant, and academic. He was part of O. J. Simpson's defense team during his trial, dubbed the "Dream Team." Uelmen says he devised the memorable line used by Johnnie Cochran in the closing argument, "If it doesn't fit, you must acquit."

Uelmen is currently a professor at the Santa Clara University School of Law, where he served as dean from 1986 to 1994. He served as defense counsel in the trials of Daniel Ellsberg and Christian Brando.

In 2006, he was appointed executive director for the California Commission on the Fair Administration of Justice, created by the California State Senate to examine the causes of wrongful convictions and propose reforms of the California criminal justice system.

== Bibliography ==
- Supreme Folly (1993) (with Rodney R Jones)
- Lessons from the Trial: The People V. O.J. Simpson (1996)
- California Evidence: A Wizard's Guide (2014)
- If It Doesn't Fit (2016)
