= Carl E. Douglas =

American attorney (born 1955)

Carl Douglas
- Born: Carl Edwin Douglas; May 8, 1955 (age 71); New Haven, Connecticut, U.S.
- Education: Northwestern University (BA); University of California, Berkeley (JD)
- Known for: Defense attorney in O. J. Simpson murder trial

Carl Edwin Douglas (born May 8, 1955) is an American attorney, best known for being one of the defense attorneys in the O. J. Simpson murder trial. Douglas was the managing attorney at the law office of Johnnie Cochran until 1998.

== Education ==
Douglas graduated from Dorsey High School in Crenshaw, Los Angeles. He earned his undergraduate degree at Northwestern University and his Juris Doctor (J.D.) degree at the UC Berkeley School of Law.

== Career ==
Within a year after leaving the Cochran firm, Douglas was one of the lawyers in the biggest verdict of 1999, in the case of Patricia Anderson vs. General Motors. In the verdict, General Motors was ordered to pay a record price of $4.9 billion for damages when two women and four children were trapped inside a 1979 Chevrolet Malibu, and the gas tank exploded on Christmas Eve of 1993. At the time, experts said it was the largest verdict for a personal injury case in history.

In March 2008, Douglas filed a lawsuit in excess of $10 million against the City of Los Angeles and the Los Angeles Police Department for the shooting death of Maurice Cox, an unarmed motorist, who was driving in South LA. Most of the shooting was captured on video by Alex Alonso, a filmmaker who posted the footage on www.streetgangs.com the same night.
