= DNA evidence in the O. J. Simpson murder trial =

Use of DNA in the American murder trial

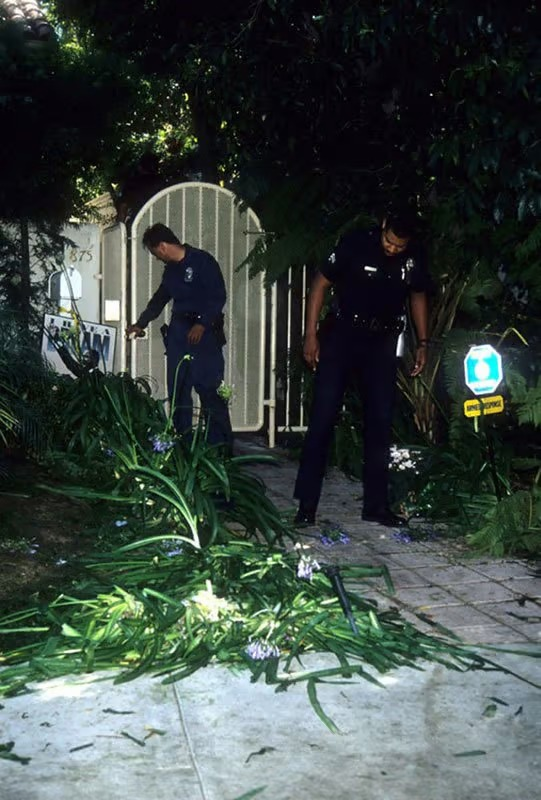
Police officers examining the crime scene.

With no witnesses to the murders of Nicole Brown Simpson and Ron Goldman, DNA evidence in the O. J. Simpson murder trial was the key physical proof used by the prosecution to link O. J. Simpson to the crime. Over nine weeks of testimony, 108 exhibits of DNA evidence, including 61 drops of blood, were presented at trial. Testing was cross-referenced and validated at three separate labs using different tests with no discrepancies found. The prosecution offered the defense access to the evidence samples to conduct their own testing, but they declined.

The defense summarized their reasonable doubt theory as "compromised, contaminated, corrupted". They argued that, during the collection phase of evidence-gathering, the evidence was compromised by mishandling and 100% of the DNA of the real killer was lost; and then contaminated during the processing phase, with Simpson's preserved DNA being transferred to all but three exhibits. They alleged that the remaining three were corrupted as the police planted that blood evidence.

Due to its abundance and exhaustive validation, the prosecution considered the DNA evidence infallible. However, at this time the public was unfamiliar with the precision and significance of DNA matching, and the prosecution struggled to get the jury to appreciate this. The defense, on the other hand, had to change strategies after neither of their forensic DNA experts would support their theory. The new strategy, according to defense attorney Alan Dershowitz, intended to elicit a cherry-picking response from the jury whereby they would discard all of the "mountain" of DNA evidence against Simpson if they could show "a few of the hills" were corrupted by police fraud resulting in a jury nullification for the murders via an error of impunity. Although three exhibits were allegedly planted, by his closing arguments, lead defense attorney Johnnie Cochran had focused on a single exhibit: the bloody glove found by detective Mark Fuhrman at Simpson's Rockingham home.

After his acquittal, all of the DNA experts returned to testify in the wrongful death civil trial.

== Background ==
=== Judge Lance Ito ===
Judge Lance Ito made several important decisions concerning the DNA section of the trial. First, he allowed the defense to argue that some of the evidence was planted despite producing no evidence that it was. Next, he ruled that the prosecution must reserve at least 10% of the DNA samples for the defense to test themselves. The prosecution actually preserved nearly all the samples for the defense but they ultimately declined to test the samples themselves. Next, Ito allowed Dr. John Gerdes to testify about contamination in prior LAPD cases. In the subsequent civil trial, all of the decisions were reversed by Judge Hiroshi Fujisaki, who banned all allegations of police conspiracy and only allowed Dr. Gerdes to testify to confirmed cases of contamination, in this case only, of which there were none.

=== Thano Peratis ===
Prison nurse Thano Peratis testified he drew an undocumented amount of blood from Simpson. When the defense asked him to estimate how much he drew, he stated approximately 8 mL. Records from the testing labs show that only 6.5 mL of blood could be accounted for, and the defense claimed that 1.5 mL was missing. During the rebuttal phase, Peratis testified again and clarified he believes he only took 6.5 mL as the records show.

=== Philip Vannatter ===
Detective Philip Vannatter testified that Simpson volunteered to give some blood for comparison to the evidence samples. Peratis drew an undocumented amount from Simpson on June 13 at approximately 3:30 pm, sealing it in an envelope, and gave it to Vannatter. The detective documented what happened and hand-delivered the sample to criminalist Dennis Fung, who was at Rockingham collecting evidence at approximately 5:30 pm. Fung had arrived at Rockingham at 7:10 am. At trial, Peratis' documentation confirmed that the blood draw took place at 3:30 pm; the jail's security camera show that Vannatter left the jail at approximately 4:00 pm and the laserdisc recorder on his police car confirmed that he did drive for over an hour to get to Rockingham. The log book at the crime scene showed that the detective arrived at 5:20 pm; Fung's written notes confirm that Vannatter transferred custody of Simpson's blood at 5:30 pm and the envelope was still sealed. The blood of both Ron Goldman and Nicole Brown, taken at autopsy by Deputy Medical Examiner Irwin Golden, was booked immediately into evidence by Detective Vannatter.

Detective Mark Fuhrman never had custody of any of the reference blood.

Detective Vannatter's decision to take the blood directly to Simpson's home rather than booking it into evidence was criticized after the trial for even making evidence-planting possible. He defended his decision by noting Fung testified that the envelope was still sealed when he received it. The defense would allege the police stole and planted one drop of Simpson's blood on the back gate at Nicole Brown's home, not his home.

== Prosecution case and witnesses ==
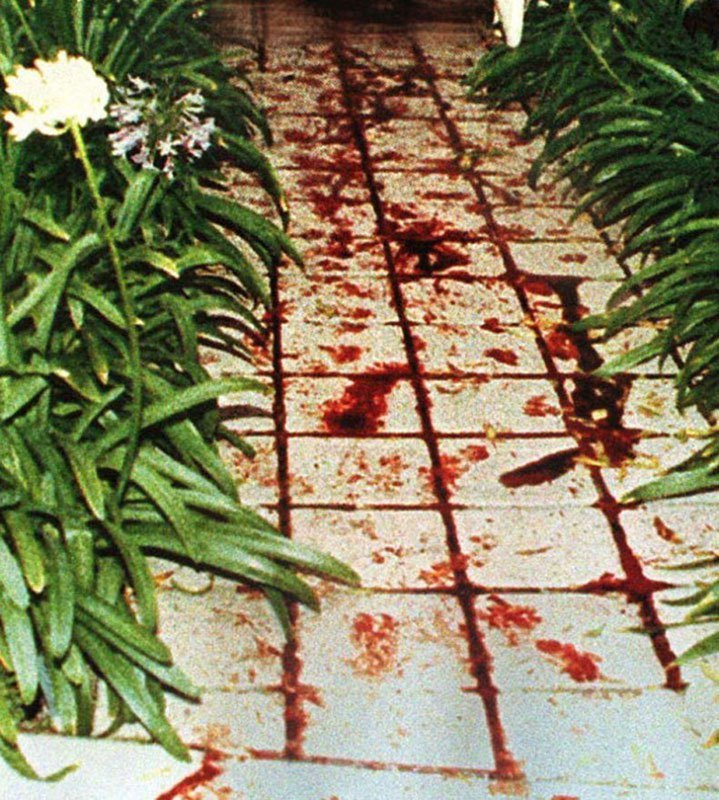
Crime scene photo at Nicole Brown's home

The only physical evidence linking Simpson to the crime was DNA evidence. The volume of DNA evidence was unique and criminalists felt they could reconstruct the crime with enough accuracy to resemble an eyewitness account. With over 100 exhibits, the defense would have to discredit all of them to establish reasonable doubt. The prosecution also produced corroborating evidence—hair follicles, clothing fibers from the victims, and fibers from Simpson's Ford Bronco—found with the exhibits to corroborate their theory of how the crime was committed.

Mistakes made during the evidence collection were highlighted and repeated during cross-examination by DNA experts, but the prosecution began offering evidence refuting the claim that the mistakes rendered the results unreliable. With three different labs cross-referencing the evidence with no discrepancies found during testing—as well as the defense declining to challenge the results by testing the evidence themselves—the prosecution expected a conviction.

Geraldo Rivera asked several jurors what their reasonable doubt was concerning the blood drops found next to the bloody footprints near the victims that were photographed hours prior to Simpson's blood being drawn. Those samples were sent to Cellmarks for testing, not the LAPD, and were shown to be Simpson's blood with chances of error being 1-in-9.7 billion. In response, juror Carrie Bess said that she thinks the blood belonged to Simpson's children; juror Marsha Rubin-Jackson said that she thinks Simpson's blood was left there next to the bloody footprints prior to the murders happening; and jury foreman Amanda Cooley said that she had no explanation for that incriminating evidence and stated that it did not factor into her decision of reasonable doubt.

=== Dennis Fung ===
Criminalist Dennis Fung testified from April 3–5, April 11–14, and April 17–18, 1995. He testified to how the blood evidence was collected from the crime scene, from the white Ford Bronco, and at Simpson's home. He stated he arrived at Rockingham at 7:10 am. He also testified that Detective Philip Vannatter gave him Simpson's reference vial of blood when he was at Rockingham.

The cross-examination of Fung by Barry Scheck lasted nine days. Scheck's aggressive questioning, along with Fung's unusual willingness to volunteer confusing information while answering, made the prosecution scramble to explain his answers. He said he did not see a blood drop on the back gate in a photo from June 13 despite collecting blood from that spot on July 3.

Later, the prosecution found a photo that showed the blood was there on June 13. Fung also said he could not see blood on the socks that he collected from Simpson's bedroom. The prosecution later demonstrated that blood is only visible under a microscope. Fung also admitted that blood evidence was collected in plastic bags, not paper bags as recommended, and stored in a police van without being refrigerated for up to seven hours. Scheck aggressively tried to shake Fung's timeline about when he received Simpson's donated blood, hoping to show that police actually delivered it the following day, June 14, instead of June 13, giving them a whole day with Simpson's blood they could allegedly use to frame him. The 10-minute window was documented; though Scheck tried to discredit Fung's documentation by the fact that a page of Fung's notes had been replaced with a copy, the original page was found and shown to be exactly the same.

=== Andrea Mazzola ===
Criminalist Andrea Mazzola testified on April 20, 1995, and from April 25–27, 1995. Her testimony was also interrupted by jury problems. She testified to much the same as Dennis Fung—the collection, storage, and transportation of evidence at the crime.

During cross-examination, the defense tried to portray Mazzola as inexperienced. She defended herself stating she had just moved to LA recently and had worked at the Kern County Police district as a criminalist for eighteen months. She admitted to a few mistakes at the crime scene while collecting evidence including using one swatch to collect blood from three separate spots in the Ford Bronco and occasionally not changing gloves when picking up different pieces of evidence. She also verified the blood evidence was kept unrefrigerated for up to seven hours after collection.

=== Collin Yamauchi ===
Criminalist Collin Yamauchi testified from May 24–31, 1995. He was the first scientist to handle and perform PCR analysis on several key evidence items, including the glove and the sock from Simpson's bedroom in his Rockingham home. He testified that the blood of Simpson, Brown, and Goldman was on the glove: Brown's blood was found on the sock in Simpson's bedroom and Goldman's blood was found in Simpson's Bronco. All but one drop of blood collected by Fung and Mazzola was PCR testable.

During cross-examination he testified that during preparation for PCR testing that a reference card is created using Simpson's donated blood for comparison to the evidence items. When asked, he initially stated he was not sure he changed his gloves when he moved from the reference card to the evidence items but then remembered he did change his gloves. In either case, he maintains that he never touched any of the evidence items with his gloved hands and used sterile instruments to handle the items that were then changed between each item. The defense claimed that Yamauchi lied when he said he changed his gloves and did handle items with his gloved hands and transferred Simpson's DNA to the evidence items from the reference vial. Yamauchi denied this, stating that before and after each evidence item is tested a blank sterile control swatch is run to determine if cross-contamination like that occurred and all of the controls were negative. Yamauchi also pointed out the defenses DNA expert Henry Lee did not change gloves either when he examined the evidence items.

=== Gregory Matheson ===
Gregory Matheson, chief forensic chemist at the Los Angeles Police Crime Lab, testified from May 1–5, 1995. His serology results revealed that blood drops found alongside a trail of bloody shoe prints leading from the victims matched Simpson's blood with the error rate being 1-in-200. Matheson stated that none of Mazzola's admitted mistakes would have resulted in contamination of evidence. Matheson also testified about the only drop of blood that was too degraded for testing found under Nicole Simpson's fingernails. The defense said that blood belonged to the "real killer" but Matheson said that blood was probably hers because that hand was found in a pool of her own blood and wet blood degrades quickly. Later criminalist Renee Montgomery, using a different test, proved it was Nicole Brown's blood.

During cross-examination Matheson admitted that Fung and Mazzola made several mistakes during evidence collection. He admitted the blood from the Bronco and back gate at Brown's home should have been collected on June 13, not July 3, she should have used three separate swatches to collect from three different spots on the Bronco not just one, and the evidence should have been refrigerated after collection in the police van. When asked about the 1.5 mL of Simpson's blood unaccounted for he stated that Peratis didn't document how much was taken from Simpson so there is no way to prove that blood is actually missing. He noted though that small amounts of blood do stick to pipettes, gloves, and other lab instruments during testing so that could possibly explain some blood being unaccounted for.

=== Robin Cotton ===
Dr. Robin Cotton, Lab director of Cellmark Diagnostics, testified May 8–15, 1995. She testified to restriction fragment length polymorphism (RFLP) testing, the most precise DNA-matching at the time. She testified that blood found on a sock in Simpson's bedroom was Nicole Brown's with a 1-in-170 million chance of error, and that the blood drops next to bloody footprints near Nicole's body was Simpson's with a 1-in-9.7 billion chance of error.

During cross-examination, she admitted that two cross-contamination errors had occurred at Cellmark in 1988 and 1989 but the errors were found during quality control tests and had not occurred since. She stated the DNA sample sizes needed for RFLP testing in this case are too large to be susceptible to the degraded DNA cross-contamination the defense alleged. The only possible scenario would be a mixture of two persons DNA being typed, Simpson's and the "Real Killer" if cross-contamination occurred, but only Simpson's was found. She admitted her tests cannot demonstrate how the blood got on Simpson's sock, meaning her tests do not refute the possibility the blood was planted.

=== Gary Sims ===
Criminalist Gary Sims of the California Department of Justice Crime Lab testified May 16–22, and again from May 31 to June 1, 1995. He testified to the results from DQ Alpha DNA matching. His results also showed Nicole Brown's blood on the sock found at Rockingham with a 1-in-7.7-billion chance of error, the blood on the back gate at Brown's home matched Simpson and the blood found inside the Bronco belonged to the two victims with a 1-in-21 billion chance of error for both.

During cross-examination the defense insinuated the matches were from the results from cross-contamination. Sims denied this stating that none of the 108 exhibits tested showed evidence of contamination and also mentioned the defense was offered the chance to test the evidence samples for contamination themselves but they declined. Gary Sims testified again on May 31 and had the jurors look at the socks from Simpson's bedroom with their naked eye and then through a microscope. The purpose of this demonstration was to show the blood stains were only visible under a microscope.

During recross-examination Sims acknowledged that foliage can contaminate blood samples but denied that occurred on the drop of blood on the back gate at Brown's home. The defense then asked if that blood could have been planted by the police since it was collected on July 3 and Fung said he didn't see it in the photo the defense showed him from June 13. Sims denied the claim and said a different photo of the same gate taken on June 13 shows the blood was already there.

=== Renee Montgomery ===
Criminalist Renee Montgomery of the California Department of Justice Crime Lab testified from May 23–24, 1995. She reported the results from D1S80 DNA matching, narrating her results using a poster board to reconstruct the prosecution's theory of how the crimes were committed. Her results showed that Simpson was present during the murders as evidenced by his blood being found next to the bloody footprints next to the bodies. Her results show that he fled the scene through the back gate as evidence by his blood found on a trail of blood drops leading away from the victims towards and on the back gate. Her results then show he got in his Bronco and drove home as evidenced by the victim's blood found on the door outside and inside on the console of the Bronco. Her results then show he entered his home through the backyard as evidence by a trail of blood stains with his and the two victims found leading behind his home and the bloody glove found behind his home that had blood from all three. Her results suggest he changed his clothes prior to meeting the limousine driver as evidence by his sock he left in his bedroom having Nicole Brown Simpson's blood on it.

During cross-examination, when asked about mishandling of evidence at the crime scene, she stated none of the mistakes they made would add Simpson's blood to the evidence unless it was already there. When asked about cross-contamination with Simpson's preserved blood at the LAPD crime lab, she stated that all of the evidence she testified to, except the glove and sock, were shipped directly to her and not handled by anyone in that lab. When asked about the DNA on the glove being degraded after being kept unrefrigerated and then contaminated by Simpson's preserved DNA, she denied that happened at the LAPD lab. If all the DNA was degraded and then contaminated with Simpson's blood, only Simpson's DNA should be on the glove. The fact that the victims' blood was found as well is proof that that did not happen. When asked about the reliability of her relatively new test, she stated that it was the same test the FBI was currently using and was accepted in every courtroom in the country, as reliable science.

== Defense case and witnesses ==
=== "Compromised, Contaminated, Corrupted" ===
The defense stated the DNA evidence against Simpson was not reliable. They said the police compromised the evidence by committing several mistakes when collecting it including occasionally not changing gloves between evidence items, using one swatch to collect blood from three drops of blood on the Bronco dashboard, packaging the swatches of blood evidence using plastic bags, not paper bags as recommended, and storing them in a police van for up to seven hours unrefrigerated. This resulted in 100% of the "real killers'" DNA being lost. They argued that Simpson's blood found on the evidence samples resulted from contamination in the LAPD crime lab with the reference blood in all but three exhibits. The remaining three exhibits that could not be explained by contamination were planted by the police. Although evidence of mistakes made during collection were shown at trial, no evidence of their contamination or corruption claim was presented.

The contamination claim was dependent on all the blood in the case being 100% degraded and the real killer's DNA lost. If that did not happen, contamination would only produce a mixture of Simpson's DNA and the killer's. The contamination claim likewise would spread EDTA to the evidence samples which could be tested for as it was a preservative found in the reference vials of Simpson and the two victims. The contamination claim was also limited to just the LAPD crime lab as it was not alleged at the two consulting labs, the state department and Cellmarks diagnostics, where most of the DNA testing was done. The defense also declined to test the samples themselves for the “real killer's” DNA or for EDTA.

Once the prosecution began showing evidence the samples were not completely degraded and no EDTA was found in levels seen from the reference vials, the defense's reasonable doubt theory became increasingly more dependent on the claim the evidence was corrupted by a police conspiracy to frame Simpson. The jury was receptive to it.

==== Witnesses ====
===== Edward T. Blake =====
Dr. Edward Blake was retained by Simpson's defense team to discredit the DNA evidence. Blake is a world-renowned forensic scientist who pioneered the establishment of PCR testing as a reliable forensic science. The prosecution had tried to retain Blake before learning the defense had already done so. All of the DNA experts were familiar with Blake and Gary Sims, who ran the state department lab, was one of his students.

He was slated to testify but was dropped from the witness list on March 30, 1995. After concluding his review of the case, he informed the defense that his testimony is not likely to be helpful. His review found nothing negative to say about the tests from the State Department and Cellmark Diagnostics, concluding those results are likely valid and If he testified he would have to turnover his reports stating the reasons why he reached that conclusion. He was subsequently replaced by microbiologist, Dr. John Gerdes.

===== John Gerdes =====
Dr. John Gerdes testified from August 2–4 and August 7, 1995. Prior to his testimony, the prosecution asked to limit his testimony to just evidence of contamination in this case only but Judge Ito allowed him to testify about other cases of contamination as well, which they said would be misleading to the jury. During direct examination he testified "The LAPD crime lab has a substantial contamination problem. It is chronic in the sense that it doesn't go away." Gerdes testified that because of the LAPD's history of contamination, he would not consider any of the PCR results, in this case, valid because they were done by the LAPD. He testified that both the state department and Cellmark diagnostics had made cross-contamination errors in the past too. He testified their PCR results are not valid either because the evidence they tested went "through the LAPD" for packaging and shipping. The three RFLP matches he admitted were valid.

Prior to his cross-examination, the prosecution felt his testimony was unreliable and pandering to defense, noting the only three DNA tests he said were valid were the same three the defense claimed were planted. If he had said those were the result of contamination, he would have contradicted the defenses corruption claim. His claim that “you can no longer have any scientific confidence in” a newly available RFLP match linking Ron Goldman to Simpson's Bronco because the tow-truck driver had stolen items from it was also mentioned as proof he was pandering. They claim the reason Gerdes said that is because earlier he said RFLP results are not susceptible to contamination because the amount of DNA needed for that test is too large but the defense claimed those three exhibits were planted. Now the prosecution had a new RFLP match to Goldman's blood in the Bronco that couldn't be explained by contamination or fraud, so Gerdes made that claim instead.

During cross-examination Gerdes admitted having no experience or training in forensic evidence gathering or forensic DNA testing and had never done any of the tests whose results he was criticizing at trial himself or at his lab. He has testified in 23 trials; consistently for criminal defendants charged with rape, murder or both, claiming the DNA evidence against them was unreliable because of contamination. He also admitted making the same cross-contamination error he criticized the LAPD, State Department and Cellmark's lab had made in prior years, at his own lab as well. He also admitted the LAPD's crime lab has more safeguards in place against contamination than his own lab.

When Judge Ito instructed Gerdes to narrow his testimony to facts about this case during cross, journalist noted his demeanor changed as his contamination claim became more dubious. He claimed it was possible for 100% of the "real killers" DNA to degrade so every molecule was gone in the seven hours they had spent unrefrigerated in the police van but then admitted that scientists had gotten analyzable DNA for PCR tests from mummies and even fossils. He also admitted that contamination for the results at Cellmark's and the state department could only have occurred at the crime scene since LAPD packaged and ship most of the evidence they tested directly there. If that is where contamination occurred, that means Simpson's blood was at the crime scene. He later admitted that in the civil trial. He finally admitted there was no evidence cross-contamination occurred in this case and he was only testifying to "what might have occurred and not what actually did occur".

During the civil trial, Gerdes testified again. This time he was only allowed to testify about confirmed contamination in this case and admitted "There's no direct evidence of contamination in any of the test results that I looked at in this case."

===== Henry Lee =====
Dr. Henry Lee, director of the Connecticut State Forensics Science Laboratory, testified on August 23–25 and August 28. During cross-examination Lee stated Dr. Gerdes cross-contamination theory was "highly improbable".

==== Contamination allegations ====
===== Brown-Simpson crime scene =====
A total of nine blood stains were collected from the crime scene. The defense only contested the incriminating five blood drops that matched Simpson – items 48–52. Gerdes testified that those stains are all contaminates. He then admitted there was no direct evidence of contamination for any of those evidences samples except for item 52. Coincidentally, item 52 had the lowest probability of error with the chances being only 1-in-9.7 billion. Gerdes claimed that Yamauchi "handled" Simpson's reference vial prior to testing that evidence sample but admitted afterwards that he actually handled a sterile control swatch first after the reference vial and that tested negative for contamination but he claimed it was a "false negative". Gerdes then admitted that if the evidence sample contained the "real killer(s)" blood and was contaminated with Simpson's blood the result should be a mixture of both blood types but claimed that 100% of the real killers blood had "vanished" from the evidence samples after being stored in the evidence van without being refrigerated. He then admitted that the serology results that Matheson provided, which don't rely on DNA, proved it wasn't a contaminate because they also matched Simpson and only showed a single persons blood was present.

===== Brown-Simpson back gate =====
A total of three DNA evidence samples were collected from the Bundy back gate. Two were collected on June 13, 1994, while the third was collected on July 3, 1994. Gerdes claimed that the two collected on June 13 were contaminates. He admitted there was no direct evidence that cross-contamination had occurred from the reference vials to the evidence samples and conceded that the serology results matched the DNA results, proving they weren't contaminates. He admitted that the sample collected on July 3 could not be a contaminate as well because the volume of DNA was too high but the defense claimed that sample was planted by the police.

===== Simpson's Bronco =====
A total of eleven DNA samples were collected from the Bronco. Eight were collected by the LAPD crime lab on June 13 and three were collected by the State Department Crime lab on July 29. Both collections returned matches to Simpson, Brown and Goldman. Gerdes only contested the incriminating matches to the victims blood in the Bronco and claimed those results were due to cross-contamination from the reference vials. When prosecutors responded that the matches from the second collection by the State department validated the ones by the LAPD because they were the same and collected from the same spot in the Bronco, Gerdes claimed that the second collection results can't be trusted allegedly because the "Bronco had been broken into" in which case Judge Ito interjected and stated "no it hasn't". Ito then ordered Gerdes to admit that the results from the second collection prove the results from the original one were valid and that both victims blood was in the Bronco which was very significant because Ron Goldman never had an opportunity within his lifetime to be in Simpson's Bronco.

===== Simpson's bedroom sock =====
A total of six DNA samples were collected from the socks in Simpson's bedroom with matches to Simpson and Brown found. Only Brown's blood was incriminating and Gerdes admitted that the volume of DNA on that sample was too high to be attributed to contamination but the defense claimed that blood was planted by the police.

===== Rockingham glove =====
A total of ten DNA samples were collected from the glove found on Simpson's property with matches to Simpson, Brown, and Goldman. The victims' blood on that glove wasn't incriminating but Simpson's blood on that glove was so the defense only disputed that sample. Gerdes claimed it was also due to cross-contamination from the reference vial. Yamauchi conceded that when he opened Simpson's reference vial to withdraw a blood sample for testing purposes that he observed some aerosolized blood on the tissue paper he placed over the stopper when he opened the vial and noticed that some had gotten on his gloves which is why he changed them afterwards. The last thing he did after testing was put his initials on the wrist area of the glove where Simpson's DNA was found. However, Yamauchi maintains unequivocally that he did change his gloves after handling the reference vial which is standard policy. It's also untenable that only the last spot on the glove would be where Simpson's blood was found since Yamauchi touched at least nine other spots on the glove first prior to the wrist area and none of the other spots on the glove had Simpson's DNA. Lastly, Simpson's blood on the glove did not contain any traceable amounts of EDTA, which proves it did not come from the reference vial.

=== Police conspiracy allegations ===
The defense conspiracy allegation of planted evidence primarily focused on three exhibits initially: the blood on the Bundy back gate, the blood on the sock from Simpson's bedroom and the glove found at his Rockingham estate. However, by the end of the trial the defense would eventually claim that virtually all of the blood evidence was planted by the police. Barry Scheck was the principle attorney who made all of the blood planting claims.

==== Witnesses ====
===== Fredric Rieders =====
Dr. Fredric Rieders, a forensic toxicologist, testified on July 24, 1995, and again on August 14, 1995. During direct examination, he testified that the results reported by FBI Agent Roger Martz showed that EDTA was found in Simpson's blood drop on the back gate at Nicole Brown's home and Brown's blood drop on the sock in Simpson's bedroom. Using a reference article from the EPA, he testified that because the amount of EDTA in that blood is measured in "parts-per-million" (PPM) and the reference article states normally EDTA in the blood should only be detectable in "parts-per-billion" (PPB), the evidence blood contains a thousand times more EDTA than it should. Because EDTA is used as a preservative in purple top tubes for lab draws, he stated the blood could have come from their reference vials.

During cross-examination the claim was immediately debunked when the prosecution gave Rieders a fax copy of the EPA article he referenced during his testimony and had him read it out loud to the jury demonstrating he misread it and it does say "parts-per-million" of EDTA is normally found in blood. Rieders then claimed it was a typo, but the prosecution produced a certified copy directly from the EPA, confirming the PPM units of measure.

The defense called Rieders again on August 14. During redirect he clung to his claim the EDTA came from the reference vials, denied that PPM of EDTA could be found in unpreserved blood and denied that it was still used in food.

During re-cross-examination, the claim was debunked again. This time, Agent Martz tested his own unpreserved blood and found PPM of EDTA, disproving Rieders' claim. Then Dr. Rieders admitted that the EDTA results from Martz's unpreserved blood were similar to the evidence blood drops in question and not even close to levels from Martz's persevered blood from a purple top tube, which had more than a hundred times more EDTA than the evidence samples. The prosecution also produced an article from the FDA showing that not only is EDTA still used in food (which Rieders denied), it is found in the French fries and Big Mac that Simpson ate approximately one hour before the murders. He admitted Agent Martz was correct that he could not identify EDTA from a presumptive test and the identification test was inconclusive, meaning this could not even be EDTA at all. Rieders also admitted that another witness was hired by the defense to conduct another identification test of the samples for EDTA, Dr. Kevin Ballard, to confirm the defenses claim but then declined to have him testify to what the results were.

Dr. Rieders would testify to the same claim at the civil trial on December 20, 1996, but admitted during cross-examination "this might not be blood from a purple top tube" and that the results could be false positives as Martz would later demonstrate. The claim of EDTA on the sock coming from Nicole Brown's reference vial was conclusively disproved by Dr. Cotton who showed the DNA in the reference vial was more degraded than the DNA on the sock, proving it could not have come from that vial.

===== Roger Martz =====
FBI Special Agent Roger Martz testified on July 25 and July 26, 1995. The defense called Agent Martz because Dr. Rieders had used his data during his testimony. During direct examination he initially testified the blood samples "responded like EDTA responded" and "was consistent with the presence of EDTA" but then stated that he could not identify EDTA in the evidence samples This apparent turnaround during direct examination stunned the defense and when they accused Martz of changing his demeanor during the lunch break he admitted he had because he realized he was not being entirely truthful in his testimony before because he was only giving "yes" and "no" answers.

During cross-examination, Martz narrated his answers and stated EDTA is also used in food and detergents and not just blood test tubes. Martz demonstrated this by testing some of Nicole Brown's clothing that did not have blood on it and found EDTA was present. Martz then tested his own unpreserved blood and found EDTA was present there as well. Martz then compared EDTA levels in his own unpreserved blood to the evidence samples and showed they were similar. He then compared both of those results to his preserved blood in a blood test tube and showed they were not even close. Martz said that environmental conditions would not affect EDTA because it is a stable substance (one evidence sample was outside on the back gate at Brown's home) and demonstrated this by testing some preserved blood that was over a year old and showed the EDTA level was still the same as his own preserved blood taken only a few days prior. Martz also stated that, although the presumptive test mentioned by Dr. Rieders was positive, the identification test for EDTA was inconclusive, meaning he could not positively identify EDTA was present.

===== Henry Lee =====
Dr. Henry Lee, director of the Connecticut State Forensics Science Laboratory, testified on August 23–25 and August 28. Dr. Lee did not support the defense's claim of police fraud, but several of his answers gave the appearance he did. He testified that bloodstains on the console of the Bronco were consistent with a smearing motion which the defense said was evidence it was planted there by police. Lee also said he agreed with blood spatter expert Herbert MacDonell that the blood splatter on sock suggested the blood soaked through while no one was wearing it which the defense claimed was evidence the blood was planted on the sock. The defense implied that Lee's statement "something's wrong" with the DNA evidence item 47 due to a wet transfer stain in the case meant Lee supported their allegations that the police had "tampered" or planted it.

During cross-examination Lee admitted that the smearing stain does not prove that blood stain was planted. He also admitted that the transfer stain on the socks could also be produced if Simpson had touched the socks or during the swab for the phenolphthalein test for blood. Lee also admitted that the item 47 doesn't incriminate Simpson because it belongs to Brown and was found at the crime scene and admitted the claim the police "Tampered" with it or planted it to frame Simpson was nonsensical. FBI shoe-print expert William J. Bodziak testified on September 15 that what Lee thought were a second set of shoe prints were actually just impressions left in the concrete from when it was poured.

Dr. Henry Lee testified again during the civil trial but stated clearly "I never meant to imply there was scientific fact to show that any LA police officer planted or did anything, cheating, with any evidence when I said 'somethings wrong'. I did not testify to that."

==== Fraud allegations ====
===== Brown-Simpson crime scene =====
Scheck implied that Vannatter could have planted Simpson's blood at the crime scene when he returned later that evening to Simpson's home to deliver his blood reference vial to Dennis Fung but the crime scene is actually at Nicole Brown's home. Scheck then suggested that another police officer could have "sprinkled Simpson's blood at the crime scene" but the prosecution demonstrated that the blood was photographed being there prior to Simpson's blood being drawn by the nurse.

===== Bundy back gate =====
Scheck claimed that one drop of blood on the back gate at Nicole Brown's Bundy Drive home was planted by the police. As evidence, they offered the blood contained EDTA, a preservative found in purple top tubes used for blood draws, it was collected several weeks later on July 3, rather than on June 13, and 1.5 mL of Simpson's donated reference blood was unaccounted for. The officer who planted it was not named by the defense but Vannatter was implied. The prosecution countered that the EDTA levels found in the blood was consistent with that found normally in unpreserved blood and not even close to the levels found in blood preserved in a purple top tube. A different photograph of the gate on June 13 shows the blood was already there and the claim of some of Simpson's reference blood missing from the vial was refuted during rebuttal by the nurse who drew it who clarified he believes he only drew the amount the records show was used for testing.

===== Simpson's Ford Bronco =====
Scheck implied that Vannatter could have planted the victims blood in the Bronco when he returned to Simpson's home but the Bronco had been impounded prior to his arrival and wasn't even there. Scheck then claimed that the results from the second Bronco collection were unreliable because the car had been burglarized (not true) but the DNA matches are the same before and afterwards, disproving that claim. Scheck then produced two witnesses who claimed there was no blood in the impounded Bronco implying it was planted afterwards but the prosecution produced photographs of the blood in the impounded Bronco, disproving that claim.

===== Simpson's bedroom sock =====
Scheck claimed that blood found on a sock in Simpson's bed was planted there by Detective Vannatter. As evidence, they offered that Vannatter did have possession of Nicole Brown's autopsy blood briefly prior to booking it into evidence and the blood contained EDTA, a preservative found in the reference vial of Nicole Brown autopsy blood. The claim was refuted by the defense's own witness, FBI special agent Roger Martz who showed the level of EDTA in that blood drop is consistent with unpreserved blood and not even close to the levels that would be seen in blood from a purple top tube. The prosecution also countered that no blood was ever claimed to be missing from Nicole Brown's reference vial and that the records show Detective Vannatter booked the reference vials from the victims immediately into evidence right after receiving it from Deputy Medical Examiner Dr. Irwin Golden. Dr. Cotton conclusively refuted that claim by showing the blood in the reference vial is substantially more degraded than the blood on the sock, proving it did not come from that vial.

===== Rockingham glove =====
F. Lee Bailey claimed that the bloody glove found at Simpson's Rockingham estate was planted by Detective Mark Fuhrman who said he found it there. No physical or eyewitness evidence ever surfaced supporting that claim. The only reason given at trial for believing that it was planted was of Fuhrman having perjured himself when claiming he had never used the word "nigger" in the last ten years.

The glove contained DNA from Simpson and both victims, and since the blood did not contain EDTA, the possibility of it coming from the reference vials was ruled out. Thus, if Fuhrman planted the glove at Rockingham from the crime scene, Simpson's blood would have to have been at the crime scene, contradicting his claim of being home on the night of the murders. Fuhrman's DNA was also not found on the glove, thus supporting his claim that he did not plant it. The prosecution argued that Fuhrman did not plant the glove because he did not know if Simpson had an airtight alibi that night. LA County Deputy District Attorney Vincent Bugliosi concurred with the prosecutor's argument, noting as well that Fuhrman did not know whose blood was on it at the time either.

== Acquittal and aftermath ==
All of the jurors were initially confident in their reasonable doubt about the DNA evidence. All maintain they understood the DNA evidence presented at trial and defended their decision in books and interviews. However, their confidence began eroding following events subsequent to the trial and acquittal of O. J. Simpson.

=== Civil trial ===
A separate jury found Simpson to be liable for the murders in a civil trial one year after being acquitted in the criminal trial. Civil liability has a lower burden of proof than guilty beyond a reasonable doubt.

At the civil trial, Dr. Cotton showed that the DNA in Nicole Brown's reference vial was more degraded than her DNA on the sock from Simpson's bedroom, thus proving it could not have come from that vial, as the defense alleged. Also at this trial, John Gerdes admitted Simpson's blood was at the crime scene and the blood of both Brown and Ron Goldman was in the Bronco, neither of which could be explained by cross-contamination.

=== Publications and productions ===
Several jurors co-wrote and published Madam Foreman: A Rush to Judgement? (1995), defending their reasonable doubt about the DNA evidence. Critics panned the book, saying it is filled with so many factual inaccuracies, illogical arguments, and spelling errors that it reinforced, not refuted, the criticism that the jury did not understand the DNA evidence that was presented.

Prosecutor Christopher Darden published In Contempt (1996) and reiterated the claim that the jury did not understand the DNA evidence. He claimed that their relative lack of education played a role in their confusion, noting that 10 did not have college degrees and 1 even lacking a high school diploma. He also noted that multiple news outlets reported the jury not paying attention during the DNA section of the trial.

Defense attorney Robert Shapiro published The Search for Justice (1996), in which he states that he does not believe the police planted blood evidence against Simpson as suggested at trial.

Lead Defense attorney Johnnie Cochran published Journey to Justice (1996), writing that Simpson is a victim of Detectives Lange, Vannatter, and Fuhrman's police fraud to plant blood evidence against him. Critics panned the book as "self-aggrandizement," noting how Cochran says that Simpson is innocent because police planted some but not all the blood evidence against him.

In O.J. Unmasked: The Trial, The Truth and the Media (1996), M.L Rantala writes that the jurors' inability to justify their reasonable doubt about all the DNA evidence reinforced the criticism they did not understand it and that is why media reenactments of the trial, such as The People v. O.J Simpson: American Crime Story and O.J: Made in America, continue to depict them that way.

Prosecutor Marcia Clark published Without a Doubt (1997) after the trial, stating that the jurors did not understand the DNA evidence because they were unfamiliar with it and were deliberately confused by the defense about it. She pointed out that, during jury selection, the defense had specifically tried to seat jurors who were unfamiliar with DNA evidence.

Detective Mark Fuhrman published Murder in Brentwood (1997), defending himself against the claim he planted blood evidence. He notes that he never had custody of any of the reference blood, and denies planting the bloody glove at Simpson's home because no one knew his blood was on it until 2 days later when the labs tested it. He also revealed that, contrary to popular belief, he did want to testify again after the tapes revealed he used racial slurs in the past to explain those comments but the prosecution refused to redirect him. He stated his taking the 5th amendment was at the suggestion of his attorney.

Detectives Tom Lange and Philip Vannatter published Evidence Dismissed: The Inside Story of the Police Investigation of O.J. Simpson (1997), defending themselves against corruption allegation. They write that no blood from the reference vials of either Nicole Brown or Ron Goldman was ever said to be missing, and Dennis Fung had testified that the vial of Simpson's blood delivered to him by Vannatter at Rockingham was still sealed in its envelope. The book states that Fuhrman did not plant the Rockingham glove and Simpson's blood on the glove did not come from the reference vial either because it didn't contain EDTA.

Vincent Bugliosi published Outrage: The Five Reasons Why O. J. Simpson Got Away with Murder (1997), in which he says that the jury had dismissed the blood evidence by jury deliberations, noting that they did not even ask to review it prior to rendering their verdict. He concurs with other critics that the jury did not understand the blood evidence because of a combination of factors, including unfamiliarity with it, relative lack of education, and deliberate confusion by the defense about its reliability. He partially faults Judge Ito for the confusion for allowing the defense expert to conflate contamination mistakes made in other cases with this one.

Prosecutor George Clarke published Justice and Science: Trials and Triumphs of DNA Evidence (2007), stating that the defense abandoned their claim of the DNA evidence being unreliable after the Fuhrman tapes were discovered, because they believed they had a motive for the evidence being planted and that would explain the results too.

CSI: Crime Scene Investigation premiered in 2000 and ran for 15 seasons popularizing forensic science with the public, especially the reliability of DNA testing.

=== Post-trial interviews ===
Until his death in 2021, defense attorney F. Lee Bailey was the only member of the defense that still advocated for Simpson's innocence.

Defense attorney Robert Kardashian stated during an interview afterwards that he had doubts about Simpson's innocence specifically because of the blood evidence and later severed ties with him and testified for the Goldmans during the civil trial.

Defense attorney Alan Dershowitz stated during an interview after the trial that the defense had concluded they could not raise reasonable doubt about all of the DNA evidence and instead attempted to elicit a cherry picking response from the jury whereby they would discard all of the DNA evidence against Simpson if they could show some of it was planted by the police. He said they did prove Vannatter planted Nicole Brown's blood on the sock despite Dr. Robin Cotton debunking that claim at the civil trial.

While declining to say whether or not he thinks Simpson is innocent, defense attorney Carl Douglas stated that the racial gap concerning Simpson's guilt is shrinking for 2 reasons: first, Simpson's celebrity status has faded among African Americans; secondly, there is greater acceptance of DNA evidence as reliable. He also notes that research shows African-American distrust of the police remains unchanged.

Defense attorney Barry Scheck stated in an interview that he and Peter Neufeld only attacked the way the DNA evidence had been collected and preserved but not the reliability of the results. Scheck specifically said the outcome of the trial "muddied" the premise of the Innocence Project. Neither Scheck or Neufeld believe the police planted blood evidence against Simpson as suggested at trial. Neither of their publications after the trial mention the Simpson case.

Defense attorney Gerald Uelmen stated the defense's strategy was to raise reasonable doubt about the DNA evidence based on how it was collected and preserved at the crime scene, not the results obtained at the lab.

Defense forensic DNA expert Ed Blake revealed after the trial that he didn't testify because his review of the case found no criticism of the testing conducted by Gary Sims or Dr. Robin Cotton.

The testimony of defense non-forensic expert Dr. John Gerdes—in which he raises doubt about most of the DNA evidence via contamination—is omitted by the defense in all of their post-trial publications about the trial. This would be despite the fact that jurors mention his testimony in justifying their reasonable doubt on several occasions, especially in their immediate post-trial interviews and in their co-written book, Madam Foreman (1995). Unlike the other experts in this case, Gerdes did not enjoy publicity from the trial because his claim that forensic DNA testing is unreliable was not true. This abandonment by the Dream Team of Gerdes' contamination claim after the trial made the jury defending their verdict untenable. Subsequent portrayals of the trial in the media often omit his testimony as well and none of the defense attorneys retained him again, including Scheck and Neufeld.

Geraldo Rivera asked three jurors what their reasonable doubt was concerning the blood found next to the bloody footprints near the victims. Photos of the crime scene show that the blood was there hours before blood from Simpson was taken; thus, it was not planted. The blood was collected and shipped directly to the state department lab, not the LAPD lab; thus, contamination could not explain it. The blood was testable; thus, it was not compromised. Foreman Amanda Cooley responded that she had no explanation for that incriminating evidence and such did not factor into their reasonable doubt decision, implying she ignored it. Juror Marsha Rubin-Jackson responded that she believes Simpson's blood to have been left there next to the bloody footprints prior to the murders happening; however, defense never suggested this and Simpson said he was never there that day. Juror Carrie Bess responded that she thinks the blood belonged to Simpson's children; however, Dr. Cotton said that the chances of it being anyone else other than O.J. Simpson was 1-in-9.7 billion.

==== Lionel "Lion" Cryer ====
Lionel "Lion" Cryer was one of the jurors who came out strong for Simpson's innocence during deliberations and afterward. He was especially known in the media as the juror who raised a Black Power salute after the "not guilty" verdict was announced; an act that generated considerable controversy. However, in interviews in the 2010s, Cryer stated he does now believe that Simpson is guilty of the murders. He admitted that what he thought at the time to be reasonable doubt of the DNA evidence really was not.

He stated that a portion of the trial dragged on longer than most people realize. In media portrayals, the DNA section of the trial is shortened to just the important clips, whereas the jurors had to listen to 8 hours a day for nearly 9 weeks of technical terminology that was difficult to follow. He admits that the jury not reviewing the DNA evidence during deliberations was a mistake, but states that such was because most of them have voted to acquit during the initial straw poll, and the two hold outs changed their mind quickly so further review of the evidence was not necessary.
