= LACP =

LACP may refer to:

- League of American Communications Professionals, an organization encouraging quality in communications
- Link Aggregation Control Protocol, a computer network protocol
- Los Angeles County Police, California, US
