= Burrito Express =

Mexican restaurant in Pasadena, California

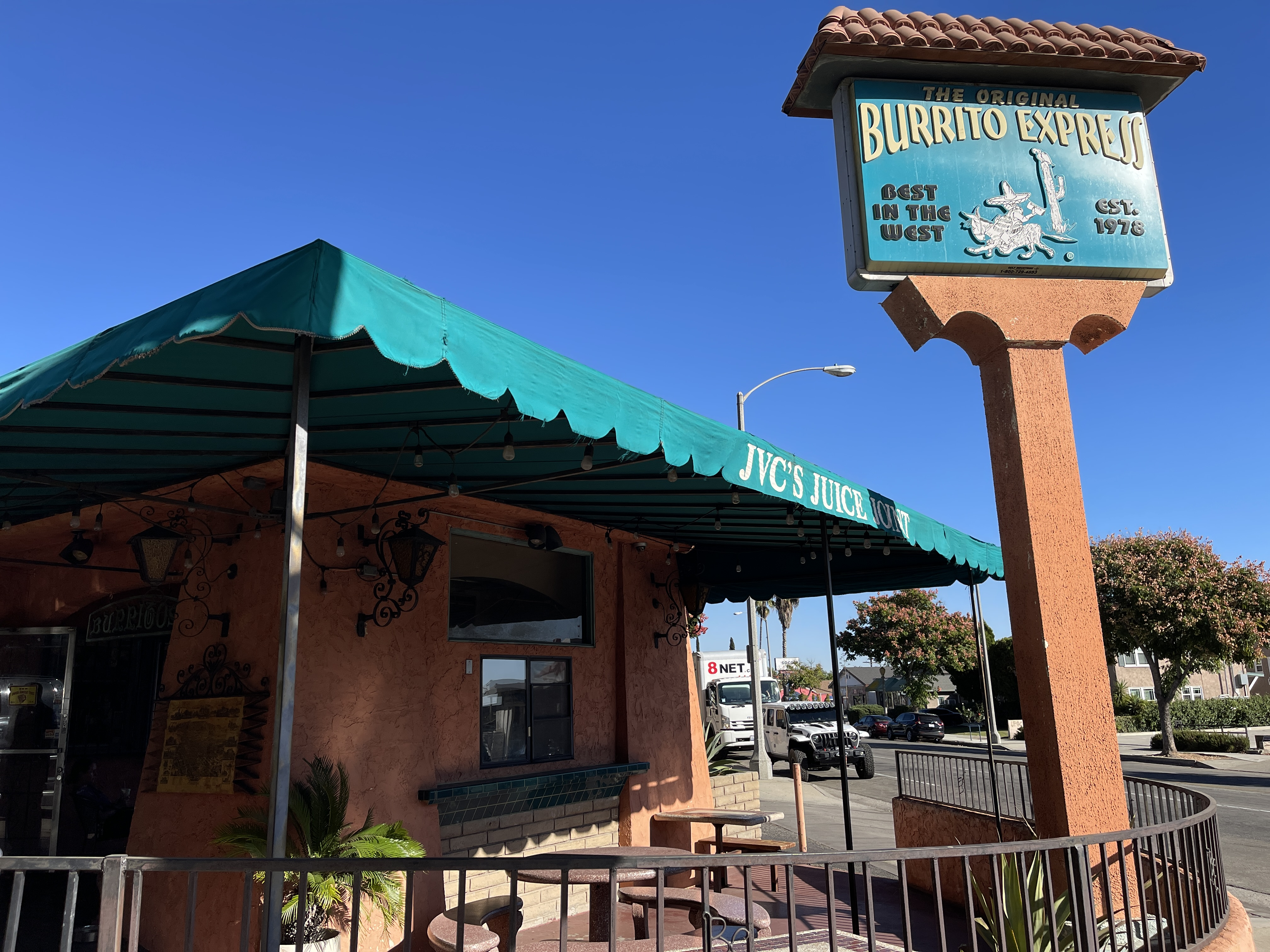
- Exterior in 2024
- Interactive map of Burrito Express

Restaurant information
- Established: 1978
- Owners: Will Orozco; Deya Orozco
- Previous owners: Victor Cuadra, Lila Cuadra (1978–1999); Ranulfo Rosas (1999–2008)
- Food type: Mexican-American
- Location: 1597 E. Washington Blvd., Pasadena, Los Angeles, California, 91104, United States
- Coordinates: 34°10′09″N 118°07′04″W
- Website: burritoexpresspasadena.com

Burrito Express is a Mexican restaurant in Pasadena, California. It was founded in 1978 by Victor and Lila Cuadra, a Mexican couple raised in Los Angeles. By 1980, the former was able to quit his job as an officer for the California Highway Patrol in order to focus on the business. In 1999, the Cuadras sold the business to longtime employee Ranulfo Rosas. He, in turn, sold the business in 2008 to his nephew Will Orozco and his wife Deya. Their burritos named after Lance Ito and Ross Perot drew national attention in the 1990s.

== History ==
Burrito Express was founded in 1978 by Victor Cuadra, an officer for the California Highway Patrol and an amateur arm wrestler, and his wife Lila; both were born in Mexico and raised in Los Angeles. Prior to opening the restaurant, Victor assisted his mother with her Mexican delicatessen in neighboring Highland Park.

The Cuadras opened Burrito Express in response to their frustration with common criticisms about Mexican restaurants of the time. "It used to bug us", Victor said in 1991. "Anglos used to say, 'It's a hole in the wall. Awful, but the food is good'".

As a result, Burrito Express' dining area and order counter are modeled after American-style fast food restaurants. By 1980, Victor quit his job with the California Highway Patrol in order to concentrate on his business. In 1991, the Los Angeles Times reported that it was one of the few Latino-owned businesses in Pasadena. At the time, the restaurant's annual gross sales were nearly US$300,000 (equivalent to $709,138 in 2025).

A catering order for the California Congressional Society in Washington, DC, as well as demand from former customers living in other states led Burrito Express to establish a mail order business in 1986. For a fee of US$37 (equivalent to $78.18 in 2025) they shipped six-packs of frozen burritos across the United States. In 1995, mail order sales comprised 10% of Burrito Express' revenue. Mail orders led Victor to style himself the "king of the flying burrito". Intervention from health inspectors, who demanded that burritos for shipment be prepared off-site, forced the end of mail orders.

In 1999, the Cuadras, who subsequently moved to Italy, sold Burrito Express to Ranulfo Rosas, an employee who had worked at the restaurant since its opening. In 2008, Rosas sold Burrito Express to his nephew Will Orozco and his wife Deya. Will had been familiar with the restaurant when it was owned by the Cuadras, but developed a thorough knowledge of the business while his uncle owned it. In a 2019 interview, Will said he was contemplating a shift in career trajectory when he was offered the opportunity to buy the business.

Rosas continued to work at Burrito Express for another five years in order to ensure a smooth transition for longtime customers. Few changes resulted when the Orozcos took over ownership. Among the new items offered were tortas, carne asada fries, and shaved ice; the latter is available only during the summer.

Consequences from lockdown restrictions that resulted from the COVID-19 pandemic in California in 2020 led to a substantial decline in revenue. Supply chain shortages and inflation made for additional difficulties in 2021, which Deya said were worse than the previous year. Staff was halved and the Orozcos took to working twelve-hour shifts six days a week. Word of mouth about the possibility that the business might not survive late 2021 spread on social media, which motivated customers to queue in support. Deya said in 2022:

We could not understand what was going on and then someone explained that people on Facebook had posted about our situation. It was incredible for us to think that words—just words—brought out this action and love.

Increased business and a grant from the Pasadena Community Foundation ensured Burrito Express remained open.

== Reception ==
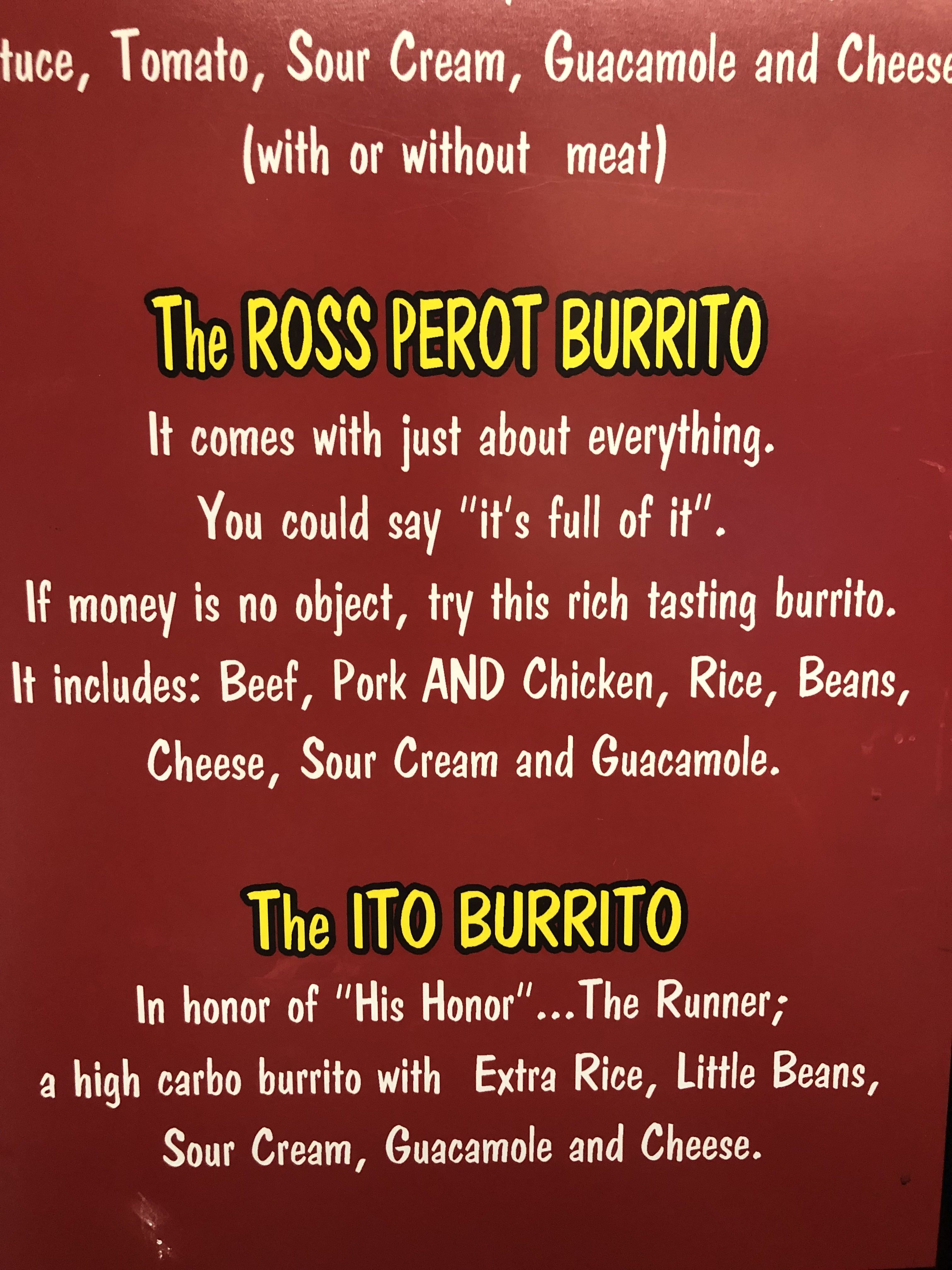
Burritos inspired by Lance Ito and Ross Perot on the menu

Burrito Express has been voted several times as "best burrito" by the readers of the Pasadena Weekly in its annual "Best of Pasadena" competition. A 2009 review in that publication said:

[Burrito Express'] high-standards are reflected in the taste. There is nothing quite like the first crunch of a taco plump with tender pork and fresh vegetables. Many diners admit they can't seem to shake the delicious taste of spicy green and mild red from their tongue. Dabbing their fingers in the sauce, they devour the dishes right to the last lettuce rind.

In the 1990s, their burritos named after Lance Ito and Ross Perot drew national attention. The latter's burrito was described by the Cuadras' son as having "a little bit of everything, or you can say it's full of it".

The food critic Jonathan Gold was among Burrito Express' regular customers.
