= Margaret York =

American police officer (1941–2021)

- Born: August 8, 1941; Canton, Ohio, U.S.
- Died: October 17, 2021 (aged 80); Los Angeles, California, U.S.
- Known for: Was model for Cagney & Lacey, first female Deputy Chief
- Spouse: Lance Ito
- Police career
- Department: Los Angeles Police Department
- Service years: 1965 - 2002
- Rank: Deputy Chief

Margaret York (August 4, 1941 – October 17, 2021) was an American police officer, considered to have had a groundbreaking impact during her time in the Los Angeles Police Department. She was reported to be the inspiration for the American television show Cagney & Lacey.

== LAPD career ==
She began working for the Los Angeles Police Department in 1965 as a radio operator, and then attended the police academy and became an officer in 1968. After 24 years in the department she was promoted in 1992 to Captain at the age of 51. She was the fourth woman to achieve that rank in the department. She was promoted to Commander in 1997, only the second woman to rise to that rank. In 2000 she was the first woman promoted to the rank of Deputy Chief. She retired from LAPD in 2002 and became the final chief of the Los Angeles County Office of Public Safety, a special purpose police department for parks, public buildings, and other county facilities. The LACOPS was disbanded in 2009 and the roles, but not the staff, were transferred to the Los Angeles County Sheriff's Department.

York was partnered with another woman, Helen Kidder, in the homicide department in the 1970s and they reportedly had the highest rate of confessions of any team. That team was reportedly the inspiration for the television show Cagney & Lacey that paired two female detectives, although the show was situated in New York City.

== O. J. Simpson trial ==
In 1981 York married Lance Ito, a prosecutor who later was appointed judge for the Los Angeles Superior Court. During the O. J. Simpson murder case trial, over which Ito presided, a key witness in the trial was Mark Fuhrman, a police officer who once was a subordinate of York's. Fuhrman had been caught on tape disparaging York, and the prosecution in the trial threatened to call York as a witness as a way to disqualify Ito from continuing his role in the case.

== Personal life ==
York was involved in philanthropic work, particularly with the Salvation Army. She died on October 17, 2021, at the age of 80.
