= Brandon Tholmer =

American serial killer

- Born: 1949 (age 76–77); New Orleans, Louisiana, U.S.
- Other name: "The West Side Rapist"
- Conviction: Murder
- Penalty: Life imprisonment

Details
- Victims: 12–34
- Span of crimes: 1981–1983
- Country: United States
- State: California
- Date apprehended: November 7, 1983
- Imprisoned at: California Medical Facility

Brandon Tholmer (born 1949) is an American serial killer and rapist responsible for at least 12 murders of elderly women. The killings occurred between January 1981 and October 1983 in Los Angeles's West Side, which earned Tholmer the nickname of The West Side Rapist. In total, 34 such murders were recorded, during which the killer(s) had a similar modus operandi, and investigators were able to conclusively link Tholmer to 12 of them. In 1986, Brandon Tholmer was convicted of four of the murders and was sentenced to life imprisonment.

== Biography ==
Little is known about Tholmer's early life. He is known to have been born in 1949 into an African-American family in New Orleans, Louisiana, and showed signs of an intellectual disability early in life. He grew up in a socially dysfunctional environment, in which he was abused by relatives. As a result, he left his home in the late 1950s and began to live a vagrant lifestyle in the company of other street children. This led to him developing only rudimentary social skills.

Beginning in 1960, Tholmer was repeatedly arrested for various offenses, and spent several years in institutions for juvenile delinquents, where he was subjected to physical and sexual abuse by the other teenagers, because of which he developed a mental disorder and began to show signs of paraphilia.

In the early 1970s, Brandon moved to Los Angeles, where for several years he was forced to engage in low-skilled labor. During this period, he began to show signs of gerontophilia. In 1975, he was arrested for assaulting and raping an elderly woman. On the basis of a forensic medical examination, he was declared insane and was sent off for compulsory treatment in the Patton State Hospital.

In June 1979, he was released and returned to Los Angeles, where he rented a house in the Hollywood area. Over the following years, he periodically did casual work while trying to build a career as a musician, acting as a drummer in the little-known rock band named "The Hostages". At the time of his arrest, Tholmer worked in a shoe factory in Monterey Park and was dating a girl. His favorite song was called "Killer on the Loose", by the Irish rock band Thin Lizzy.

== Arrest and exposure ==
Tholmer came under suspicion at the end of October 1983, for the murders of 82-year-old Lucille Pyle and 72-year-old Mary Pauquette, and as a result, police began surveiling him on November 2. He was arrested five days later, after he was caught trying to break into the house of 85-year-old Irene Rogers, who was paralyzed. After the arrest Tholmer's apartment was searched, from which more than 200 pieces of jewelry, watches, photographs and other small items were found, which investigators suspected were trophies taken from the home’s of Tholmer’s victims. Many of the victims lived alone within one mile of Brandon Tholmer's Hollywood apartment.

On the basis of this evidence, in January 1984, Brandon was charged with the murder of Mary Pauquette (killed on September 12, 1983); 80-year-old Rose Lederman (killed in August 1981); 69-year-old Wollomooloo Woodcock (strangled in August 1982); 76-year-old Lorraine Wells and 70-year-old Dorothy Fain in May and August 1983, respectively. He was also charged with sodomy, arson, the rape of a 38-year-old woman in August 1981 and the attempted attack on Rogers. Despite the fact that the investigators found evidence of Tholmer's involvement in at least seven other murders, he was not charged with any of them.

== Trial ==
The trial began in early 1986. In addition to physical evidence, fingerprints belonging to Tholmer were found at the crime scenes, with the prosecution presenting more than 100 witnesses. A number of Brandon's friends and acquaintances stated that he had repeatedly shown signs of gerontophilia, trying to get to know older women in two supermarkets where his girlfriend worked, and where he spent a lot of his free time. Some of them also told the court that he periodically would find temporary work in the evening or at night, setting off to an unknown location to do it. Tholmer himself could not give an explanation for this, and was also unable to provide an alibi on the dates of the murders. Ultimately, in July 1986, Brandon Tholmer was convicted of murdering Pauquette, Lederman, Woodcock, and Fain, while he was not convicted of the Wells murder. While Tholmer was convicted of only 4 of the murders, investigators were able to close a total of 12 homicide cases linked to Tholmer. The trial prosecutor, Deputy District Attorney Lance Ito, was appointed to the Municipal Court of the Los Angeles Judicial District by then Governor George Deukmejian, and elevated by Deukmejian to the Los Angeles Superior Court in 1989. Ito retired from the court in 2015 after presiding over several high-profile trials including that of O. J. Simpson.

The defense lawyers emphasized on the bullying their client was subjected to in his childhood, which ultimately led to mental, emotional and behavioral problems. Tholmer was spared the death penalty, and in November, he was instead given several consecutive life sentences, without the chance of parole.

== Current status ==
As of October 2022, the 72-year-old Brandon Tholmer is still alive, and continues to serve his sentence at the California Medical Facility, due to multiple health-related problems.

== See also ==
- List of serial killers in the United States
