= Los Angeles General Services Police =

Historical police department

- Common name: LA General Services Police
- Abbreviation: LAGSPD
- Motto: Sworn to Serve - Committed to Protect

Agency overview
- Formed: 1979
- Dissolved: 2012

Jurisdictional structure
- Operations jurisdiction: Los Angeles, California, USA
- Legal jurisdiction: Los Angeles
- General nature: Civilian police

Operational structure
- Police Officers: 113
- Security Officers: 300
- Agency executive: Gary S. Newton, Chief of Police

Website
- Archived official website at the Wayback Machine (archive index)

The Los Angeles General Services Police was a security police agency that provided police and security officer services to Los Angeles City Hall, Los Angeles Central Library, Los Angeles Zoo, Los Angeles Convention Center and city parks, recreation centers, senior centers, Venice and other beaches, and recreational facilities. The department had similar duties of the now also defunct Los Angeles County Office of Public Safety, which was absorbed into the Los Angeles County Sheriff's Department.

The department's last police chief was Gary S. Newton.

The department was established as a security force in 1979. A peace officer component was created in the late 1980s and reorganized in 2003 when Los Angeles City Council members Wendy Greuel and Jack Weiss proposed to create the Office of Public Safety by merging the many city security services (General Services Police, Library Security, City Park Rangers, Convention Center Security, and Los Angeles Zoo Security) into one centralized division of the Department of General Services. In July 2012 through January 2013, the department and its duties were absorbed into the Los Angeles Police Department.

As of 2007, GSPD was authorized 112 police officers and over 350 security officers and support staff with an annual budget of over 30 million dollars excluding employee benefits. The department patrolled over 470 parks, 72 libraries and 900 municipal buildings. It was the 10th largest law enforcement agency in L.A. County. The department was also responsible for citywide contract security services as well as physical and technology based access and surveillance throughout the city (excluding proprietary departments).

The department was dissolved by the Los Angeles City Council. The City Council voted to close the department to save the city money and as a result, police and security personnel were transferred into the new Los Angeles Police Department (LAPD) Security Services Division, Division #36.

== See also ==
- List of law enforcement agencies in California
