= Mount Hollywood Congregational Church =

Church in Los Angeles, USA

Coordinates: 34.102854°N 118.293620°W

Mount Hollywood Congregational Church is a United Church of Christ congregation in the Los Feliz neighborhood of Los Angeles.

Mount Hollywood was founded in 1905. John Raitt was once a soloist in the choir, Judge Lance Ito was enrolled in its Sunday School, and Los Angeles County Supervisor John Anson Ford was a member.

Membership had been as high as 600 in the 1920s, when it built its sanctuary, but is around 50 today. In 2012 the church sold its sanctuary, citing high maintenance costs, and moved into a converted storage shed behind Hollywood Lutheran Church.

The congregation has long been an advocate for social justice. In 1941 it came to the aid of Hollywood Independent Church, a Japanese-American congregation, by safeguarding the church's property and homes of its members after they were sent to internment camps. All of the ministers in Mount Hollywood's history have been pacifists.

The church's altar has a wooden cross made from camphor wood off of a tree in the yard of a church that had been bombed in Hiroshima. The cross is inscribed with "He is our peace."

The Rev. Anne Cohen was installed as the church's pastor on Nov. 3, 2013.
