= League of American Communications Professionals =

The League of American Communications Professionals LLC (LACP) is an association established in 2001 in order to create a forum within the public relations industry that facilitates discussion of best-in-class practices within the profession while also recognizing those who demonstrate exemplary communications capabilities.

== Best Practices Reports and Narrative Evaluation Services ==
LACP develops several reports annually that focus on the best practices within certain disciplines. Examples include the annual report best practices report and the employee communications best practices report. Narrative evaluations are also produced in order to provide individual clients with feedback.

== Communications Tools ==
LACP has developed several tools to benefit professional communicators including PR Tools 2012, which includes 25+ PR templates and 60+ "how-to" PR guides on CD.

== Membership ==
LACP membership is available to communications professionals working at least 20 hours per week. Students and retired PR pros are also eligible.
