= Los Angeles County Office of Public Safety =

Defunct security police agency

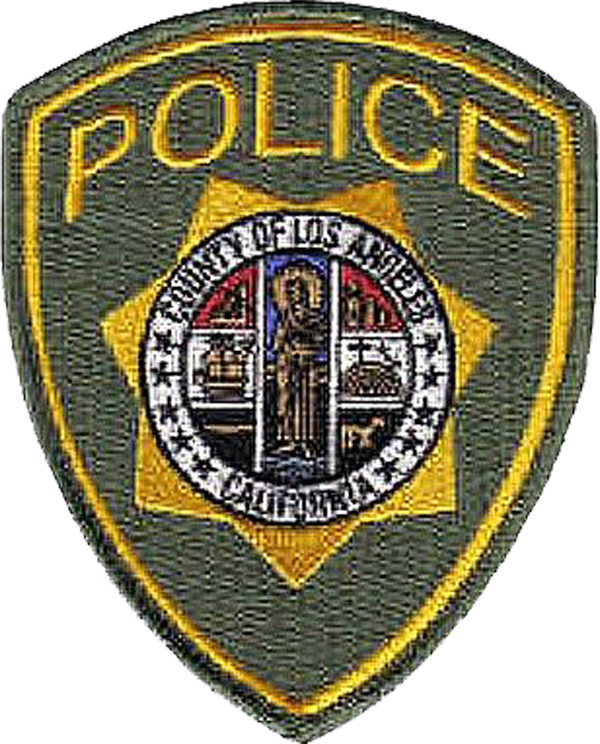
- Patch of the Los Angeles County Police, featuring the pre-2004 L.A. County seal.

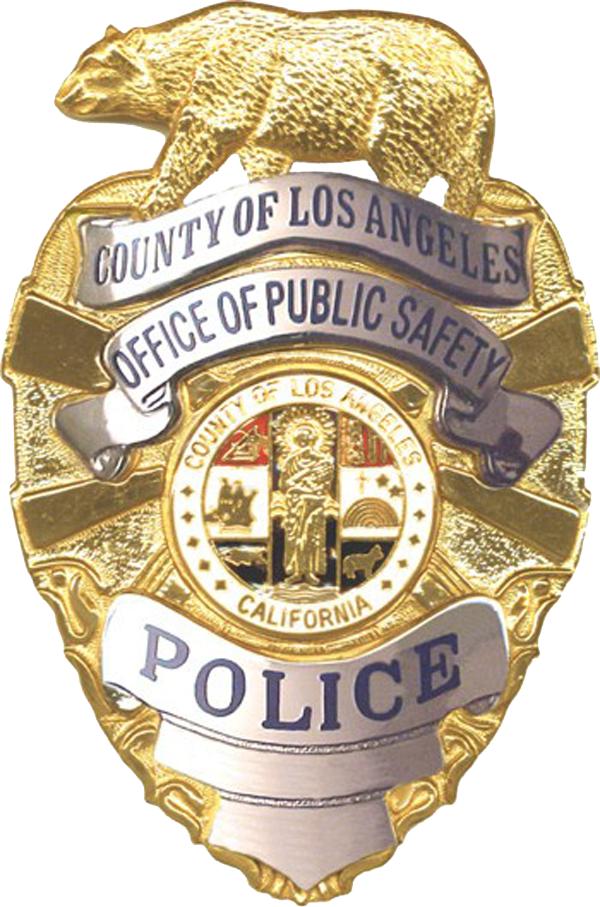

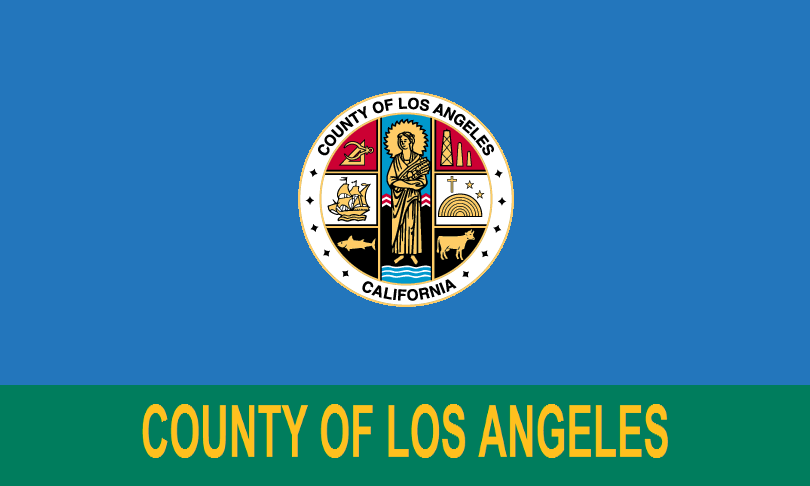
- Flag of Los Angeles County from 1967 to 2004.
- Common name: Los Angeles County Police
- Abbreviation: LACP
- Motto: "Dedicated to the Community We Serve"

Agency overview
- Formed: 1998
- Dissolved: 2010
- Employees: 668(2010)
- Annual budget: $114,565,000 (2010)

Jurisdictional structure
- Operations jurisdiction: Los Angeles County, California, US
- General nature: Civilian police

Operational structure
- Police Officers: 579
- Unsworn members: 180

Website
- Los Angeles County Office of Public Safety (no longer valid)

The Los Angeles County Office of Public Safety (LACOPS), less formally known as the Los Angeles County Police, was a security police agency for Los Angeles County, California, United States. It was formed in 1998 by consolidating three Los Angeles County law enforcement agencies: the Department of Parks and Recreation Park Police, which was formed in 1969 as Los Angeles County Park Patrol, and the Department of Health Services and Internal Services Department’s Safety Police. OPS was the fourth-largest law enforcement agency in Los Angeles County, which employed 579 sworn peace officers and 140 civilian personnel, and utilized over 800 contract security guards. The agency had an annual budget of $100 million in 2009. OPS was initially a division of the Los Angeles County Department of Human Resources but was placed under the umbrella of the newly created Public Safety branch of the Chief Executive Office in 2007.

The County Police was separate from the Los Angeles County Sheriff's Department, similar uniforms and patrol areas led to confusion over the identification of County Police personnel with Sheriff's Department personnel on several occasions. They also had no connection with the City of Los Angeles General Services Police, despite their agency title of Office of Public Safety.

== History ==
OPS originated from the consolidation of various County departments' security forces. These Security Officers attained peace officer powers in the early 1970s, and were gradually retitled into Safety Police Officers. In the 1990s, the Department of Health Services Safety Police, the Parks & Recreation Department Park Police, and the Internal Services Department Safety Police were merged into the Office of Public Safety, which was unofficially known as the County Police.

There were calls for OPS to be merged with the Los Angeles County Sheriff's Department (LASD) in 1992 and 1997, but the attempts have been repeatedly rebuffed by its officers, the Board of Supervisors, or LASD for various reasons. The primary reason cited was the inability of the Executive/Command Staff to perform the Administrative functions necessary to effectively manage a modern law enforcement entity of this size. On August 8, 2007, the California State Supreme Court denied hearing the appeal of a discrimination lawsuit brought by County police officers. The officers prevailed at trial, convincing a jury that the predominantly minority force had been denied appropriate pay and benefits due to racial discrimination, but the jury's decision was then reversed by the Appellate Court. The high court's refusal to hear a final appeal appeared to make a merger with LASD more likely, as they restarted their take-over study just days after the decision was handed down (September 20, 2007). Supervisor Knabe commented to local media the force should be disbanded for costing the County so much money. The merger study reports submitted to the Board of Supervisors served as a basis for what became a final decision about the proposed work place reduction. The Board of Supervisors set aside sufficient funding to complete work place reduction on September 22, 2009. On December 15, 2009, the Board of Supervisors voted 4–1 to eliminate OPS. The Sheriff's Department took over OPS responsibilities.

After the Board of Supervisors voted to eliminate the OPS and turn its responsibilities over to LASD, all OPS employees were either hired by the LASD or placed on paid administrative leave by June 30, 2010, which was the target date set by the Board of Supervisors for its Human Resources to have placed the adversely affected employees in alternate jobs. Because few displaced OPS employees had actually been offered alternate employment by the target date, the Board of Supervisors extended the sunset period to September 30, 2010. Those deemed unqualified for alternate employment by that date were laid off. The former responsibilities of OPS are now handled by the newly formed LASD County Services Bureau and Parks Bureau.

== Leadership ==
The last Acting Police Chief was Steven S. Lieberman, a twenty-four-year veteran of the department. Since the creation of the agency, it has previously been led by former LAPD Interim Chief Bayan Lewis and former LAPD Deputy Chief Margaret York. There were interim chiefs in between the terms of Lewis and York; John White and William Nash. William Nash was almost immediately demoted by Margaret York. LASD Commander William Rogner was approved by the Board of Supervisors on December 15, 2009, to run the agency until it was eliminated.

== Uniforms ==
County Police officers wore the uniform traditional to county law enforcement agencies in California. This included olive green pants and a tan uniform shirt. Shoulder patches, name plates, and badges completed the uniform. Some special units such as WMD, or boat units wore modified uniforms, mostly green BDU's or some version of a uniform polo shirt. Historically, the earliest uniformed county security officers wore the same dark green uniforms that Sheriff's Deputies wore until the late 40s, but with unique "Los Angeles County Guard" patches and a bear-top shield badge instead of a star. From the 1950s to the adoption of the department-wide tan-and-green uniform, security officers wore differing uniforms with patches depending on the county department they worked for. Department of Health Services officers wore all-tan uniforms, Mechanical Department officers were issued tan shirts and brown pants, and Park Patrol officers had tan-and-green uniforms, similar to the Sheriff's Department.

The badge was the standard Los Angeles County design, being a shield, surmounted by a bear, of gold-colored metal with silver-colored ribbons. The seal of the county of Los Angeles was superimposed on the center of the badge, with the words "County of Los Angeles" on a ribbon just under the bear. A ribbon indicating the name of the agency "Office of Public Safety" appeared just above the seal of the county. The title of the position of the person authorized to wear the official badge was inscribed on a ribbon placed just below the seal of the county and the serial number of the badge appeared at the bottom of the badge below the title of the position. Badges of predecessor Safety Police and departmental security agencies were of the same design, but of all gold-colored metal without silver ribbons, and with the specific department name and position listed.

== Equipment ==
Officers were issued the Glock 22 .40cal pistol, although some officers in special units carried the smaller Glock 23, or the larger Glock 21. 45ACP pistol. They retired their aging stock of Beretta 92F and 92FS's in 2006 which were initially issued in 1988. Officers were authorized to carry firearms off duty and were issued a flat-badge for identifying themselves as peace officers when not in uniform. While on patrol, officers had rapid access in most vehicles to an array of weapons including tasers, AR-15's, Mossberg 590 shotguns, less-lethal (bean bag) shotguns, and 40mm launchers.

== Transportation ==
Most patrol assignments drove Ford Crown Victoria Police Interceptor police cars equipped with, as with the majority of police vehicles, touch screen computers, emergency lights & sirens, back-seat partitions, and push bumpers. The department changed their vehicle graphics in 2007 to increase their recognition with the public. GMC Yukons, Chevrolet Tahoes, and ATV's were common within the department as well.

== Structure ==
The OPS maintained four bureaus:

- Administrative Services Bureau
  - Contracts & Monitoring
  - Fiscal Services
  - Fleet Management
  - Human Resources
  - Information Systems
- Facilities Services Bureau
  - DPSS Offices (Department of Public Social Services)
  - Dispatch Center and Communications
- Parks Services Bureau
  - Belvedere Station (East Los Angeles)
  - South Station (South Los Angeles)
  - Whittier Narrows Station (South El Monte)
  - Quartz Hill Substation (Quartz Hills)
  - Castaic Station (Castaic Lake)
  - Bonelli Station (Bonelli Regional Park)
- Health Services Bureau
  - Los Angeles County-USC Medical Center
  - Harbor-UCLA Medical Center
  - King/Drew Medical Center & Rancho Los Amigos National Rehabilitation Center
  - Olive View Medical Center

OPS did not have its own custody facilities and as a result, booked people arrested at one of several L.A. County Sheriff's stations throughout the county. Almost all county police stations were part of a larger structure belonging to a county department that contracts for their services.

OPS fielded several specialized units, including SPU (Special Problems Unit), DPU (Dignitary Protection Unit, Labor Relations, Internal Affairs, Background Investigations, Canine, Boat, TRF (Tactical Response Force), WMD (Weapons of Mass Destruction), and a reserve Mounted Unit. The WMD trained and prepared for the inevitable chaos at county medical facilities in the event of a terrorist attack. TRF officers trained and prepared for civil disturbances and crowd control. Both were part-time, on-call units which depend on officers in other full-time assignments to fill their ranks.

== Requirements to become an OPS Officer ==
County police recruits were to have been 20 years and six months old at the time of hire. They had to possess a high school diploma or GED, a California driver's license, and pass all phases of the selection process, consisting of: a written exam, an oral interview, a background investigation (including a polygraph exam), and medical and psychological exams.

County police officers and public safety dispatchers were required to have and maintain a valid POST Certificate, which substantiates that their character, education, training, and experience are up to California State standards.

== See also ==
- List of law enforcement agencies in California
- Department of Public Safety
- County police
