= Lance Ito =

American judge (born 1950)

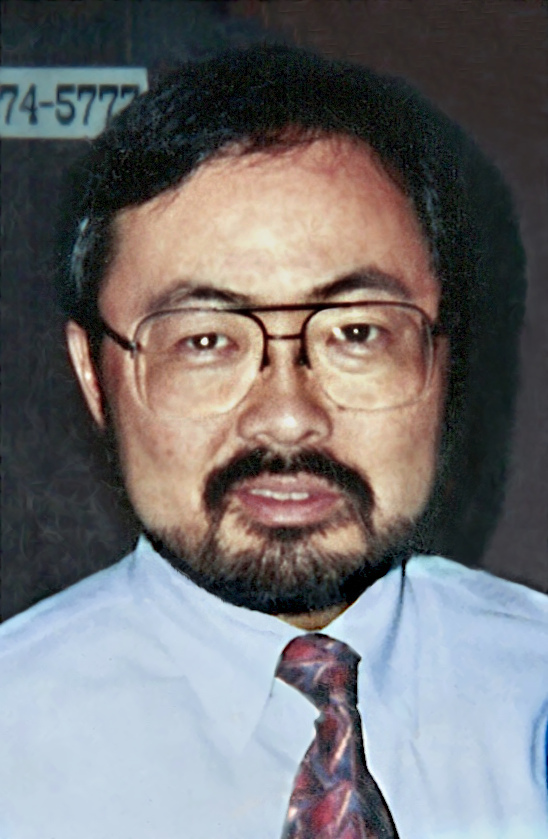
- Ito in 1995

Judge of the Los Angeles County Superior Court
- In office 1987–2015
- Appointed by: George Deukmejian

Personal details
- Born: Lance Allan Ito; August 2, 1950 (age 76) Los Angeles, California, U.S.
- Party: Democratic
- Spouse: Margaret York (m. 1981; died 2021)
- Education: University of California, Los Angeles (BA); University of California, Berkeley (JD)

Lance Allan Ito (born August 2, 1950) is an American retired judge, best known for presiding over the criminal trial for the O. J. Simpson murder case, held in the Los Angeles County Superior Court in 1995.

== Early life and career ==
Ito was born in Los Angeles to Jim Ito and Toshi Ito. Both his parents were kept in internment camps for Japanese Americans with their families during the Second World War. Ito was enrolled in Sunday School at the Mount Hollywood Congregational Church. Ito attended John Marshall High School, where he was student body president and received the Scholar Athlete award in 1968. He earned his bachelor's degree with honors from the University of California, Los Angeles, in 1972, and his J.D. degree from the then University of California, Berkeley, Boalt School of Law in 1975. He then joined the Los Angeles district attorney's office in 1977, working in the hardcore gang unit and the organized crime and terror unit, among others. During his time he successfully prosecuted Brandon Tholmer.

In 1981, he married Margaret Ann York, the first woman to attain the rank of Deputy Chief in the Los Angeles Police Department and that department's highest ranking woman officer when she retired in 2002. The two met while at an Eagle Rock murder scene.

Republican governor George Deukmejian appointed Ito to the Municipal Court in 1987, and then elevated him to Superior Court in 1989.

In a high-profile case in 1991, Ito determined that Soon Ja Du, a convenience store owner who had shot and killed Latasha Harlins, was not a flight risk, denying the deputy district attorney's request to revoke Du's bail.

In 1992, he initially handled the indictment against Lyle and Erik Menendez, two brothers who were accused and later convicted of murdering their parents.

Ito was named Trial Judge of the Year by the Los Angeles County Bar Association in 1992.

== Charles H. Keating Jr. trial ==
In 1992, Ito presided over the trial of financier Charles H. Keating Jr. Keating's ensuing ten-year sentence was later overturned on appeal because Ito had neglected to instruct the jury to determine whether Keating intended to defraud investors. It was the prosecution's position that Keating was liable as a matter of strict liability.

== O. J. Simpson murder trial ==
Ito presided over the 1995 murder trial of O. J. Simpson, at which Simpson was acquitted. His decision to allow television coverage of the trial was controversial, and Ito faced criticism for seeming to enjoy the press and for allowing too many sidebars and recesses.

During the trial, the prosecution requested that Ito recuse himself when it came to light that his wife, Margaret York, had been detective Mark Fuhrman's superior officer in the past. Fuhrman had been called to testify by the prosecution regarding his discovery of evidence in the case. During cross-examination, Fuhrman claimed that he had not used racial epithets to refer to African-Americans during the last ten years. Simpson's defense team unearthed tapes in which Fuhrman had used racial epithets as recently as 1988, and they wished to introduce them as evidence to prove that Fuhrman had perjured himself, in order to discredit his testimony. However, in the tapes, Fuhrman disparages York's appearance and suggests that she used her gender to advance in the police force. The prosecution requested that Ito step down because they felt that derogatory remarks toward his wife might bias Ito against Fuhrman, though prosecutors later withdrew the request out of fear that it would result in a mistrial.

== Post-Simpson trial career ==
Ito declined to give interviews regarding the Simpson murder trial because ethical guidelines for California trial-court judges forbid commenting on pending matters or matters likely to come before the courts. He has noted his disbelief that public interest in the trial extended through the turgid DNA section of the trial. He has used his status to work on issues of judicial reform, such as increasing the number of interpreters and enforcing rules for foreign-national defendants in the court.

In 2002, he was appointed to be the judge in the case of Efren Saldivar. Los Angeles County announced in April 2012 that Ito's courtroom, along with 55 others, would be closed due to budget cuts. Ito retired in 2015.

== In popular culture ==
- Ito was portrayed by voiceover artist Billy West on The Howard Stern Show.
- Ito was portrayed on Saturday Night Live, first by Mike Myers, and then, following Myers' departure from the show, by Mark McKinney.
- The Tonight Show with Jay Leno had a recurring skit called "The Dancing Itos" featuring five bearded Asian-American dancers.
- Kenneth Choi portrayed Ito in the 2016 series The People vs. O. J. Simpson.
- A caricature of Ito appears in the Pinky and the Brain episode "Of Mouse and Man" and the Freakazoid! episodes "Dexter's Date", "The Freakazoid", and "Virtual Freak".
- Ken Jeong dressed as Judge Ito for a 1995 Halloween party on the ABC series Dr. Ken.
- In the Manhunt episode "USA vs. Theodore J. Kaczynski", Ito is mentioned by the judge of Unabomber’s trial, as he claims to not be like him.
- Ito appeared as a California judge in Sliders season 1 episode 9.
- Ito appears in the Uncle Luke music video of "Scarred"
- Ito appears in the O.J Simpson documentary O.J.: Made in America.
- Clyde Kusatsu portrays Ito in the 2000 film American Tragedy
- Ian Chen's character, Evan Huang, dresses up as Ito in a Halloween episode of Fresh Off the Boat (Season 3, episode 3)

== See also ==
- List of Asian American jurists
