= Fuhrman tapes =

20th-century interviews with Mark Fuhrman

The Fuhrman tapes are 13 hours of taped interviews given by Mark Fuhrman, former detective of the Los Angeles Police Department, to writer Laura McKinny between 1985 and 1994.

The tapes include many racial slurs and remarks made by Fuhrman, including uses of the word "nigger", descriptions of police brutality perpetrated on black suspects, misogynist slurs and descriptions of the harassment and intimidation of female Los Angeles police officers by male officers. Portions of the tapes were admitted into evidence during the 1995 O.J. Simpson murder trial. In the tapes Fuhrman also made many references to the "planting of evidence" and implied that police brutality and evidence planting were common practice in the Los Angeles Police Department.

== Creation of tapes ==
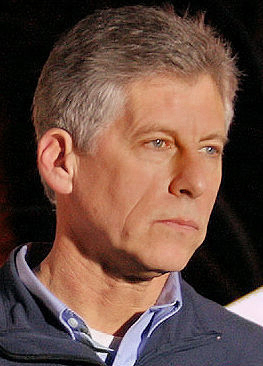
Mark Fuhrman, the LAPD officer recorded by Laura McKinny in the tapes

Screenwriter Laura Hart McKinny was interested in writing a screenplay and a novel about the experience of women police officers. After learning that Fuhrman was a Los Angeles Police Department (LAPD) officer and had strong views about the employment of women as LAPD officers, McKinny engaged Fuhrman as a consultant to provide background information about the reality of the experiences of LAPD officers and to serve as a technical advisor in the development of a screenplay. Fuhrman and McKinny began meeting for taped interviews in February 1985 and continued meeting until July 1994.

Although the tapes became notorious for their racial slurs, the bulk of the tapes involved Fuhrman discussing an organized group of male LAPD officers known as MAW, or Men Against Women, who reportedly engaged in sexual harassment, intimidation, discrimination and criminal activity against female LAPD police officers, often endangering the female officers' lives. In a taped interview to McKinney in 1985, Fuhrman bragged about his leadership in MAW, a secret organization within the LAPD that reportedly had 145 members in five of the city's 18 police divisions during its heyday in the mid-1980s. In the tapes, Fuhrman calls women "frail little objects" who "watch soap operas" and that "females lack the one ingredient that makes them an effective leader and that is testosterone, the aggressive hormone." Fuhrman also stated on the tapes that "you've got to be able to shoot people, beat people beyond recognition, and go home and hug your little kids. [Women] don't pack those qualities." Fuhrman was also recorded stating that women who were good leaders "are either so ugly or they're a lesbian or they're so dyke-ish that they are not women anymore."

In further interviews, Fuhrman made the statements "we had them begging that they'd never be gang members again, begging us" and that he would tell black people "You do what you're told, understand, nigger?"

== Role in O.J. Simpson murder trial ==
The Los Angeles Times, August 30, 1995
"Fuhrman Tapes Aired: a Recital of Racism, Wrath"

"'You've got 200 niggers who are trying to take you prisoner," [Mark] Fuhrman said in one interview ... [He had been] asked whether he had probable cause to arrest black suspects. 'Probable cause?' Fuhrman responded. 'You're God.' ... Fuhrman boasted of fabricating evidence against suspects and expressed amazement about the racial makeup of the Los Angeles Police Department's Wilshire Division. ... 'Wilshire Division is all niggers. All niggers, nigger training officers, niggers.'"

The tapes, as well as Fuhrman himself, became central to the 1995 O.J. Simpson murder trial. Fuhrman was the detective who found a bloody glove on Simpson's estate. This glove was later determined to be the mate of another glove found at the murder scene and to be soaked in the blood of both victims. Simpson's defense team argued that Fuhrman planted the glove on Simpson's estate following the murder. To bolster their case, excerpts of the tapes were admitted as evidence. Outside the presence of the jury, Fuhrman was questioned by the defense team, invoking his Fifth Amendment right on all questions, including the question, "Did you plant or manufacture any evidence in this case?"

Earlier in the trial, Fuhrman testified that he had not used the word "nigger" within the last ten years, which proved later to be perjured testimony with the admission of the tapes. His recorded words as well as his denial was a major blow to the prosecution's case.

== Aftermath ==
Fuhrman was charged with perjury for his testimony at the trial. He pleaded no contest. After paying a $200 fine, Fuhrman was released from his probation in April 1998 and the conviction was later expunged from his record.

Following the trial, Fuhrman apologized "from the bottom of [his] heart" that he had used racist terms and denied ever having been a racist. Fuhrman was uncomfortable with the attention the trial brought to him and wished things had been different. "I want my private life back and I'm never going to have it." Denying having ever planted evidence, Fuhrman stated, "there was never a shred, never a hint, never a possibility--not a remote, not a million--, not a billion-to-one possibility--I could have planted anything. Nor would I have a reason to."

== Response ==
The Los Angeles Police Department conducted an investigation to determine the validity of Fuhrman's claims on the tapes. The LAPD announced that Fuhrman exaggerated many of the acts of racially motivated brutality described on the recordings. Of the 29 incidents described in McKinny's tapes and transcripts, 17 could not be connected to known events. Investigators did link 12 accounts to known events, but their investigation was inconclusive, aside from the use of racial epithets and male officers' misogyny towards female officers, which was substantiated. Regarding police brutality towards suspects, "just about everything Fuhrman told McKinny, which could be connected to an actual event, was bigger, bloodier and more violent than the facts", the report concluded. In one instance, Fuhrman reported that a suspect was beaten to death and three others were hospitalized with broken bones. While this was connected to a known event, only one suspect was treated for minor injuries caused by another officer.

Although the LAPD Commission investigating the Fuhrman tapes "determined that in almost every instance, the now-retired detective was exaggerating or lying about episodes of police brutality," the report confirmed that Fuhrman was "telling the truth when he spoke of institutional harassment of women on the force." In their report, the Commission characterized the actions and lack of actions by the supervisors in addressing systemic misogyny in the police force as "unconscionable." "In some cases, the actions of the group inhibited some women from safely and effectively performing their duties and created fear in many women that these male officers would not provide backup if they requested it in the field," the report said. "Further, there was evidence that the Men Against Women officers would ostracize male officers who did not support their boycott against female officers."

On May 16, 1997, the Los Angeles Times ran a piece signed by Katherine Spillar (Co-chair, the Women's Advisory Council to the Los Angeles Police Commission) and Penny Harrington (Director of the National Center for Women & Policing) and stating that "The long-awaited Police Commission report released on the Mark Fuhrman tapes revealed that the LAPD command has known for years about orchestrated sexual harassment and intimidation of female officers and has done nothing to stop it. Internal Affairs files secured by a reporter revealed that the LAPD has been regularly covering up serious problems of family violence, principally wife-beating, within its ranks," adding "officers who beat their wives are regularly exonerated or receive only minor suspensions, even for brutal acts of violence." Harrington also publicly responded to Fuhrman's views that female police officers are unfit for police work because of their biological sex. "Research shows women officers are more skillful at de-escalating potentially violent situations than their male counterparts, and so MAW's efforts to drive women out only exacerbates the LAPD's excessive force problems," explained Harrington, "The Fuhrman tapes reveal just how aggressively women police officers are shunned for their more community-oriented policing skills and their refusal to go along with using excessive force." Harrington criticized the report, saying it "was good in documenting that there is a problem, but I don't think the report offers any solutions." She also called for an independent "blue-ribbon commission" to investigate gender bias and sexual harassment issues at the LAPD.

== See also ==
- Őszöd speech - Hungarian political scandal involving leaked audio
- Nixon tapes
