= Mark Fuhrman =

American police detective (1952–2026)

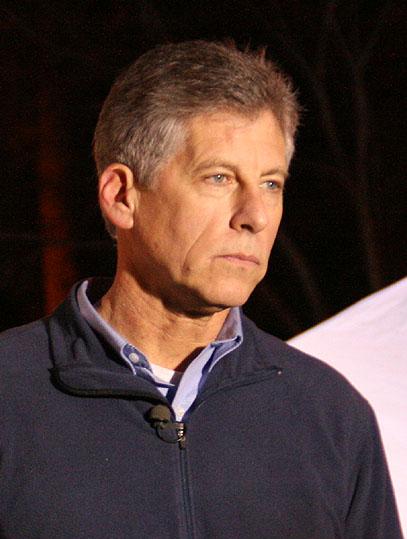
- Fuhrman in 2008
- Born: February 5, 1952; Eatonville, Washington, U.S.
- Died: May 12, 2026 (aged 74); Kootenai County, Idaho, U.S.
- Police career
- Department: Los Angeles Police Department
- Service years: 1975–1995
- Rank: Sworn in as Officer (1975); Officer (1975–1989); Detective (1989–1995)
- Other work: Author; Radio host
- Military career
- Allegiance: United States
- Branch: United States Marine Corps
- Service years: 1970–1975
- Rank: Sergeant

Mark Fuhrman (February 5, 1952 – May 12, 2026) was an American law enforcement officer, author, and commentator. As a detective for the Los Angeles Police Department (LAPD), he became known for his role in the Nicole Brown Simpson and Ron Goldman murder investigation and the subsequent prosecution of O. J. Simpson. After his retirement from the LAPD, Fuhrman wrote several true crime books and hosted talk radio.

In 1995, Fuhrman was called to testify regarding his discovery of evidence in the Simpson case, including a bloody glove recovered at Simpson's estate. During the trial, witnesses claimed that in the 1980s, Fuhrman frequently described African Americans as "niggers", claims he denied. In response, Simpson's defense team produced recorded interviews with Fuhrman and witnesses, which proved that he had repeatedly used racist language during those interviews. As a result, the defense claimed that Fuhrman had committed perjury and was not a credible witness. The questionable credibility of the prosecution's witnesses has been cited as one reason Simpson was acquitted.

The defense claimed that Fuhrman planted key evidence as part of a racially motivated plot against Simpson. When asked under oath (with the jury not present), Fuhrman declined to answer all questions, invoking his Fifth Amendment right. These questions included whether he planted or manufactured evidence. Fuhrman retired from the LAPD in 1995. In 1996, he pleaded nolo contendere (no contest) to perjury for his false testimony related to his use of racial epithets. Fuhrman claimed he was not a racist and apologized for his use of racist language.

Some of Fuhrman's former co-workers who are minorities expressed support for him. Fuhrman maintained that he did not plant or manufacture evidence in the Simpson case, and Simpson's defense team did not present any evidence to contradict this claim.

== Life before the O. J. Simpson murder trial ==
Fuhrman was born in Eatonville, Washington, on February 5, 1952. He attended Peninsula High School in Gig Harbor, Washington. Fuhrman's parents divorced when he was seven years old, and his mother remarried briefly. In 1970, at the age of 18, he enlisted in the United States Marine Corps, where he was trained as a machine gunner and military policeman. He served during the Vietnam War era, although his service in the Vietnam theater was restricted to being assigned to the USS New Orleans, an amphibious assault ship stationed offshore. Having attained the rank of sergeant, he was honorably discharged in 1975. After leaving the military, Fuhrman entered the Los Angeles Police Academy and graduated in 1975.

In 1981, Fuhrman requested leave for workers' compensation. During a psychiatric interview regarding this claim, Fuhrman expressed racist sentiments, stating that he stopped enjoying military service because of alleged insubordination from Mexican-Americans and African-Americans, whom he described as "niggers". Fuhrman received workers' compensation and remained on paid leave until 1983. During this time, Fuhrman attempted to leave the police force permanently and receive a stress disability pension. In a 1982 psychiatric interview, he claimed that he had "tortur[ed] suspects and con[ned] internal affairs detectives", that he would choke suspects and break their arms and legs "if necessary", and that he had pounded suspects' faces to "mush". Fuhrman claimed that he was afraid he would kill someone if he were returned to street patrol. Although several psychiatrists recommended that he be removed from duty completely, and others recommended that he not be allowed to carry a gun, the City of Los Angeles argued that Fuhrman's statements were merely part of an elaborate ruse to win a pension. In 1983, Fuhrman lost his case, and a subsequent appeal to Superior Court was rejected; therefore, Fuhrman returned to active duty as a police officer.

In 1985, Fuhrman responded to a domestic violence call between retired NFL football player O. J. Simpson and his wife, Nicole Brown Simpson. In 1989, a statement by Fuhrman about this call resulted in Simpson's arrest for spousal abuse. Fuhrman was promoted to detective in 1989. In October 1994, he worked to prove the innocence of Arrick Harris, an African-American male who Fuhrman believed had been falsely implicated for murder. Fuhrman retired from the LAPD in early 1995, after serving as a police officer for 20 years.

== Role in the O. J. Simpson murder trial ==
=== Background ===
During Simpson's and Brown's eight-year marriage, Simpson repeatedly physically abused her and threatened to kill her, leading her to call the police on several occasions. Fuhrman responded to one of these calls and encountered Brown hiding in her Mercedes as Simpson was trying to break the windshield with a baseball bat. In a 2016 interview with Ezra Edelman in O.J.: Made in America, Fuhrman claimed that he twice asked Simpson to put the bat down, and when Simpson refused, Fuhrman got his baton out and threatened him with violence if he continued. Simpson then obeyed and apologized, and Fuhrman offered Brown the chance to press charges so he could arrest Simpson; when she declined, Fuhrman went away telling her, "It's your life."

Brown and Ron Goldman were murdered outside Brown's Brentwood, Los Angeles, condominium on the night of June 12, 1994. Robert Riske and his partner were the first police officers on the scene in the early morning of June 13, and Riske found a bloody left-hand glove at the scene. At least 14 officers and supervisors, some of whom arrived on the scene before Fuhrman, reported seeing only one glove. Fuhrman and his superior, Ronald Phillips, were the first detectives to arrive; Fuhrman's partner, Brad Roberts, arrived later. Fuhrman was familiar with Simpson and Brown because of the 1985 domestic violence call. Fuhrman left Brown's condominium with Ronald Phillips and lead detectives Tom Lange and Philip Vannatter and went to Simpson's Rockingham Avenue residence. At the Simpson residence, Fuhrman found a number of blood drops in and on a white Ford Bronco parked outside. Fuhrman then climbed over the wall of the property in order to let in the other detectives. They later testified that they entered Simpson's estate without a search warrant due to exigent circumstances — specifically, a concern that Simpson might have been harmed.

In Simpson's guest house, detectives found Kato Kaelin, who told detectives that he had heard thumping sounds earlier in the night. An investigation of the property by Fuhrman produced a second bloody glove, which was later determined to be the right-hand mate of the glove found at the murder scene. The glove found on the Simpson estate, which, according to DNA testing, was soaked with the blood of both victims, was considered to be one of the strongest pieces of evidence for the prosecution. When Simpson was asked to put on the gloves during the trial, they appeared to be too small for him. The reasons for this have been debated; leather can shrink if exposed to water and heat. Simpson was arrested on June 17. On July 8, a preliminary hearing determined that there was sufficient evidence for Simpson to stand trial. On July 22, Simpson pleaded not guilty.

=== Defense team's strategy ===
In an article by Jeffrey Toobin in the July 25 issue of The New Yorker, the defense revealed that they planned to play "the race card". Specifically, Simpson's defense team alleged that Fuhrman planted the glove found at Simpson's estate as part of a racially motivated effort to frame Simpson for the murders. The article detailed Fuhrman's prior use of racist language and claims of violence made during his 1981–1982 psychiatric interviews. Although Fuhrman's psychiatric reports were later ruled inadmissible in the case because they were determined to be too old to have direct relevance, the New Yorker article was published before jury selection was finalized or jury sequestration had taken place. Potential jurors were asked how much exposure to the Simpson case they received from The New Yorker (among other media outlets) as part of the jury selection process. They were also asked their opinions of Fuhrman and other witnesses who had testified at the preliminary hearing.

The trial began on January 24, 1995, and Fuhrman took the witness stand for the prosecution on March 9. During cross-examination on March 15, attorney F. Lee Bailey asked Fuhrman whether he had used the word "nigger" in the previous 10 years, to which Fuhrman replied that he had not. The defense tried to introduce witnesses and audiotape evidence to prove that Fuhrman had lied under oath, that he had a particular animus against interracial couples, that he had a history of perpetrating violence against African-Americans, and that he had a history of being willing to fabricate evidence or testimony. In accordance with the California Evidence Code, the prosecution sought to exclude this evidence by arguing that it was too inflammatory and could prejudice the predominantly black jury. Although they conceded that Fuhrman used racial epithets on the tape, the prosecution suggested that the remainder of the material was merely exaggerated "puffing and blowing".

In Alan Dershowitz's book Reasonable Doubts that was released in 1996 he wrote that he was surprised that the prosecution team called Fuhrman as a witness to testify. Dershowitz wrote that for reasons that he thought of as both "ethical and tactical" that he would not have called him if he were on the prosecution. He wrote that Marcia Clark had to know that Fuhrman was going to lie about his use of racist language. By putting him on the stand it gave the defense the opportunity to give the jury reasonable doubt especially about some of the key evidence that Fuhrman had discovered like the glove at OJ Simpson's home.

On August 31, Judge Lance Ito ruled that evidence could be introduced to prove that Fuhrman had lied about use of the word "nigger", but that claims of violence and police misconduct were inadmissible. On September 5, the defense produced multiple witnesses and audiotapes to establish that Fuhrman had used the word "nigger" within the last 10 years. The tape eventually resulted in a perjury charge against Fuhrman, to which he pleaded no contest. First, Laura Hart McKinny took the stand. Between 1985 and 1994, Fuhrman gave taped interviews to McKinny, a writer working on a screenplay about female police officers. Fuhrman was working as a consultant for McKinny on the understanding that he would be paid $10,000 if a movie were produced. The recordings contain 41 instances of the word "nigger" used as recently as 1988, including references in which Fuhrman claimed to have perpetrated violence against African-Americans. In the recordings, he also said that he thought it is sometimes necessary to lie as a police officer and that he gave testimony about events he did not actually witness.

After McKinny, witness Kathleen Bell testified. She had met Fuhrman at a Marine recruiting station in 1985 or 1986, where she claimed that he expressed animus against interracial couples and said, "If I had my way, all the niggers would be gathered together and burned". Next, witness Natalie Singer, whose roommate had dated Fuhrman around 1987, testified that Fuhrman had told her, "The only good nigger is a dead nigger". On the television show Leeza, Singer later said that Fuhrman had also said, "Yeah, we work with niggers and gangs. You can take one of these niggers, drag 'em into the alley and beat the shit out of them and kick them. You can see them twitch. It really relieves your tension". However, Ito restricted her from giving her complete statement during the trial. Roderic Hodge then testified that while he was in police custody in 1987, Fuhrman had said to him, "I told you we would get you, nigger." Ultimately, the jury was allowed to hear only two excerpts from the Fuhrman tapes, which did not include the inflammatory violent content or material related to potential misconduct. Jurors heard Fuhrman say, "We have no niggers where I grew up", and "That's where niggers live". With the jury absent on September 6, the defense asked Fuhrman whether he had ever falsified police reports or planted or manufactured evidence in the Simpson case. Although he had earlier responded "no" when asked this question, this time, on his lawyer's advice, he invoked his Fifth Amendment right against self-incrimination.

During his closing argument, defense attorney Johnnie Cochran called Fuhrman "a lying, perjuring, genocidal racist", likening him to Adolf Hitler. He argued that Fuhrman had planted the bloody glove on Simpson's estate as part of a racially motivated plot against Simpson, which could be traced back to Fuhrman's first encounter with the interracial couple in 1985. Although there was no evidence to suggest that Fuhrman had planted the glove, his perjury about his use of the word "nigger" was widely seen as severely damaging the prosecution's credibility in front of the mostly black jury, especially in the wake of the Rodney King trial, and has been cited as one of the main reasons Simpson was acquitted.

=== Aftermath ===
Fuhrman's words on the tapes resulted in his being widely condemned, including by the prosecution. His use of racial epithets and accusations that he had planted evidence became a focal point of the trial and attracted enormous media attention that for a time eclipsed coverage of the crime itself, such that Ron Goldman's father, Fred Goldman, told the media, "This is now the Fuhrman trial. It is not the trial of O. J. Simpson, the man accused of murdering my son and Nicole."

After the trial, there was widespread pressure on Los Angeles County district attorney Gil Garcetti to bring perjury charges against Fuhrman. Garcetti initially refused, saying that Fuhrman's use of racist language was "not material to the case", a major element of proving perjury. As many members of Garcetti's office made public statements on the issue, Garcetti, citing the high emotions in his office about the case, opted to give the decision on whether or not to prosecute to Dan Lungren, the California Attorney General, to avoid the appearance of a conflict of interest.

On July 5, 1996, Lungren announced that he would file perjury charges against Fuhrman and soon thereafter offered Fuhrman a plea bargain. On October 2, Fuhrman accepted the deal and pleaded no contest to the charges. He was sentenced to three years' probation and fined $200. Fuhrman is the only person to have been convicted of criminal charges related to the Simpson case. His probation ended early in 1998, and his felony charges were expunged 18 months later.

In an October 1996 television interview with Diane Sawyer, Fuhrman said he did not plant evidence in the Simpson case. He said he is not a racist, and apologized for his use of racist language. He said he had forgotten about the existence of the audiotapes and that they were merely part of a misguided effort to have a fictional screenplay produced. A police investigation of the claims of violence on the tapes found that Fuhrman had grossly exaggerated, and many of his minority former co-workers expressed support for Fuhrman and said that they do not believe he was a racist.

In his book Outrage: The Five Reasons Why O. J. Simpson Got Away with Murder, Vincent Bugliosi argues that planting the glove would have required a far-reaching and unlikely conspiracy between Fuhrman and other police officers. Anyone involved in such a conspiracy would have been risking their life, because Article 128 of the California Penal Code states that anyone who fabricates evidence in a death penalty case—as the Brown and Goldman murder case might have become—can be sentenced to death themselves. Bugliosi further argues that Fuhrman was one of the victims in the case and that his lying under oath about racial epithets did not rise to the level of indictable perjury, because it was immaterial to the actual facts of the case.

== Post-trial career ==
=== Murder in Brentwood ===
After retiring from the LAPD in early 1995, Fuhrman moved to Sandpoint, Idaho. He wrote a book about the Simpson case, called Murder in Brentwood (1997, ISBN 0895264218), which includes a foreword by Vincent Bugliosi, the prosecutor of the Charles Manson case. In the book, Fuhrman apologized for the racist remarks on the audiotapes, terming them "immature, irresponsible ramblings" made because of a desire to make money; he contended that the tapes were merely part of a screenplay. He argued that California Attorney General Dan Lungren had charged him to garner black support for a planned campaign for governor of California, in 1998.

Despite being told that Lungren's case was "flimsy at best", Fuhrman said that he felt that he had no choice but to plead no contest. He claimed that he could not afford to mount an adequate defense; he already owed thousands of dollars in legal bills, and the city's Police Protective League would not help him pay them. He also claimed that he could not pay the living expenses for a trial that would take several months (or years, in case of an appeal). He also believed that he could not get a fair trial in the racially charged climate of the time, and he thought that an acquittal would have caused a riot which would have been similar to the 1992 Los Angeles riots. He also wanted to protect his family from harassment by the press.

Fuhrman stated that he believed that the LAPD could have arrested Simpson on the afternoon of June 13, based on the blood evidence and his apparently contradictory statements during questioning; however, he believed that senior LAPD officials did not want to take a chance on being wrong about Simpson and they wanted to wait until the preliminary genetic evidence came in. Fuhrman argued that several errors which were made by his LAPD colleagues permitted the defense team to allege that there was suspicious police conduct at Nicole Brown Simpson's residence. For instance, Fuhrman claimed that the initial search warrant which was submitted by one of the detectives who was investigating the case, Phillip Vannatter, was too short and it did not include enough details regarding the probable cause and the evidence which was on hand at the time. Fuhrman also argued that major pieces of evidence were mishandled and he also believed that his colleagues did not realize that their every move would be scrutinized in court due to the nature of the case.

Fuhrman asserted that the police and the prosecution made other errors that reduced the chances of a guilty verdict. For example, Fuhrman and his partner, Brad Roberts, found a bloody fingerprint on the north walkway gate of Nicole Brown Simpson's house. According to Fuhrman, at least some of it belonged to the suspect, because there was enough blood at the scene to suggest that the suspect was bleeding. This piece of evidence was potentially critical; Simpson claimed that he'd cut himself on the night of the murders but he hadn't been to his ex-wife's house in a week. Had the fingerprint been tied to Simpson in any way, it could have been a crippling blow to his defense. It also could have contradicted the defense team's allegation that Fuhrman planted the glove, since Fuhrman did not know nor did he have a reason to know that it was Simpson's blood; however, the fingerprint was destroyed at some point and at trial, it was only mentioned superficially. In fact, Fuhrman later discovered that Vannatter and Lange did not even know that the fingerprint was there because they never read Fuhrman's notes. Roberts could have offered testimony that would have corroborated the existence of the fingerprint and several of Fuhrman's other observations, but the leading prosecutor Marcia Clark never asked him to testify. This rankled Fuhrman almost as much as Vannatter's and Lange's failure to read his notes; Fuhrman believed that Clark decided not to call Roberts to avoid embarrassing Vannatter on the stand.

Fuhrman said that he felt that the prosecution abandoned him once the tapes were made public. He said that he pleaded the Fifth Amendment after he could not get the prosecution to call him to the stand for a redirect prior to the playing of the tapes for the jury. Fuhrman said that once the tapes came out, his reputation as a credible witness would have been nearly beyond rehabilitation. Fuhrman felt that Judge Lance Ito allowed the defense to control the trial. For instance, like Bugliosi, Fuhrman insisted that relevant case law demanded that Ito foreclose the defense from asking him about racial slurs, since any potential relevance was outweighed by the prospect of prejudice against the prosecution's case. Fuhrman also asserted that Ito should have never been assigned to the case in the first place, because Ito was married to Margaret "Peggy" York, an LAPD captain who had been Fuhrman's superior officer in the past. In the Fuhrman tapes which were recorded by Laura McKinny, Fuhrman disparaged York's appearance and he also suggests that she used her sex to advance her career in the police force. Fuhrman felt that Ito should have been challenged by the prosecution or he should have voluntarily recused himself from the case on that basis. Although the prosecutors had asked Ito to step down, they later withdrew their request out of fear that it would result in a mistrial.

=== Other books ===
For his next book, Murder in Greenwich (1998, ISBN 0060191414), Fuhrman investigated the then-unsolved 1975 murder of Martha Moxley and he theorized that the murderer was Michael Skakel, nephew of Ethel Kennedy, the widow of Senator Robert F. Kennedy. Skakel was convicted of Moxley's murder in June 2002, but his conviction was later overturned. The book was adapted for a 2002 television movie starring Christopher Meloni as Fuhrman.

In 2001, Fuhrman published Murder in Spokane: Catching a Serial Killer (ISBN 0060194375), which investigated a serial killer's spree in Spokane, Washington. In 2003, he published Death and Justice: An Exposé of Oklahoma's Death Row Machine (ISBN 0060009179), critical of the state's handling of capital punishment cases. In 2005, Fuhrman published Silent Witness: The Untold Story of Terri Schiavo's Death (ISBN 0060853379), which emphasized gaps in the medical and legal records that might allow for the possibility that Schiavo was murdered.

In 2006, Fuhrman published A Simple Act of Murder: November 22, 1963 (ISBN 0060721545), about the John F. Kennedy's assassination. In it, Fuhrman advanced a theory challenging the single-bullet theory while still maintaining that Lee Harvey Oswald acted alone. He claimed that the Warren Commission was forced to ratify the single-bullet theory for political reasons. However, he said that a dent in the chrome above the windshield of the presidential limousine used that day vindicated the story told by John Connally that the first shot that hit President John F. Kennedy did not also hit him. In 2009, he published The Murder Business: How the Media Turns Crime Into Entertainment and Subverts Justice (ISBN 1596985844), which addressed the fine line between crime reporting and entertainment.

=== Radio and television commentary ===
Fuhrman was a forensic and crime scene expert for Fox News, and he was a frequent guest of Fox commentator Sean Hannity.

Fuhrman began his radio career in Spokane, in January 1998, co-hosting the program, "All About Crime", with local veteran radio host Mike Fitzsimmons on KXLY-AM. Later, in 2001, he began solo hosting the twice a week show. When that show was cancelled in 2004, he moved over to host the "Mark Fuhrman Show" on KGA-AM in Spokane. The shows at both stations covered local and national topics and included guest callers. The KGA show ended after the sale of the station by Citadel Broadcasting Corp. of Las Vegas to Mapleton Communications, LLC, of Monterey, California.

== Personal life and death ==
Fuhrman was married to Barbara Koop, Janet Sosbee, and Caroline Lody at different times between 1973 and 2000, with each marriage ending in divorce. At the time of his death, he was married to Kelly Fuhrman. He had a daughter, Haley, with Caroline and a son with Kelly.

Fuhrman was a collector of various war memorabilia and medals. His collection of German and Nazi-era medals, which received widespread public attention during the O. J. Simpson murder trial, was used by the defense as proof that Fuhrman held white supremacist views.

Fuhrman died from an aggressive form of throat cancer in Kootenai County, Idaho, on May 12, 2026, at the age of 74. His death was announced on May 18 with the Kootenai County Coroner Office confirming his date of death.

== In popular culture ==
In Murder in Greenwich (2002), Fuhrman is portrayed by Christopher Meloni. In It's Always Sunny in Philadelphia he is described as a "hero cop" by Frank Reynolds, a character who frequently exhibits racist tendencies. In The People v. O. J. Simpson: American Crime Story, Fuhrman is portrayed by Steven Pasquale. He was portrayed by Alexander Man in Joshua Newton's film Nicole & O.J. In the Marvel Cinematic Universe (MCU) film Captain America: Civil War, he is mentioned by character Sam Wilson.
