= Janet Cooke =

American journalist

- Born: Janet Leslie Cooke; July 23, 1954 (age 72); Toledo, Ohio, U.S.
- Education: University of Toledo (BA)
- Occupation: Journalist
- Years active: 1977–1981
- Employers: The Toledo Blade (1977–1979); The Washington Post (1980–1981)

Janet Leslie Cooke (born July 23, 1954) is an American former journalist. She received a Pulitzer Prize in 1981 for an article written for The Washington Post that was later discovered to have been fabricated. Cooke returned the prize, the only person to date to do so, after admitting she had fabricated stories. The prize was awarded instead to Teresa Carpenter, a nominee who had lost to Cooke.

== Early life ==
Cooke grew up in an upper-middle-class, African-American family in Toledo, Ohio. She said her upbringing was stressful and strict, with constant pressure from both the predominantly white preparatory schools she attended and her father, whom she described as domineering; as a result, she claimed that habitual lying became a childhood "survival mechanism". She enrolled at Vassar College before transferring to the University of Toledo, where she earned a bachelor's degree. However, Cooke would claim later that she received her bachelor's degree from Vassar and a master's degree from Toledo.

In 1977, Cooke began writing for The Toledo Blade. Two years later, she interviewed for a job with The Washington Post, and was hired. She was assigned to the "Weeklies" section staff of the Post managed by editor Vivian Aplin-Brownlee in January 1980. There, she quickly gained a reputation as a prolific journalist and a strong writer, filing 52 articles in her first eight months. Aplin-Brownlee later remarked that Cooke was also "consumed by blind and raw ambition".

== Fabricated story scandal ==
In a September 28, 1980 article in the Post, titled "Jimmy's World", Cooke profiled the supposed life of an eight-year-old heroin addict named Jimmy, said to be a pseudonym. She wrote of the "needle marks freckling the baby-smooth skin of his thin, brown arms", and claimed to have witnessed episodes of heroin injection, describing them in graphic detail.

The article sparked immediate and extraordinary public outcry from Washington and beyond, with widespread concern for Jimmy and demands for him to be located. Mayor Marion Barry and other city officials organized a police search for the boy, which was unsuccessful and resulted in speculation that the story was fraudulent. Barry, under considerable public demand for a resolution, said variously that Jimmy had been entered into treatment or had died. Barry then admitted that the city still had no information on Jimmy's whereabouts, and suggested that the story was partially fictionalized, finding it unlikely that Jimmy's mother or dealer would "allow a reporter to see them shoot up", as Cooke claimed she saw.

Although some within the Post doubted the story's veracity, the paper defended it and assistant managing editor Bob Woodward submitted the story for the Pulitzer Prize for Feature Writing, which Cooke was awarded on April 13, 1981. An Associated Press (AP) article about the Pulitzer winners featured biographical profiles, including Cooke's fabricated educational background. When the article was seen by editors at The Toledo Blade, they noticed the discrepancies and alerted the AP, which in turn contacted the Post. A further review of Cooke's self-reported biography revealed additional fabrications that she had added since being hired by the Post. Her initial résumé claimed that she was fluent in French and Spanish, but she later added Portuguese and Italian; executive editor Ben Bradlee later tested her language abilities, and found that she spoke no Portuguese or Italian and only rudimentary French. In addition, she also added a claim that she had attended the University of Paris and won seven awards for her journalism in Ohio, as opposed to the one she had listed previously.

On April 14, Cooke was confronted about these discrepancies by Post editors and admitted to fabricating her background. Editors then reviewed her notes and recorded interviews for the story, and found no evidence that she had ever interviewed a child who was using heroin. While Cooke initially stood by her reporting, she began equivocating over the following hours, before finally admitting that "Jimmy" was fabricated. On the morning of April 15, Cooke issued a statement in which she publicly confessed this and announced her resignation from the Post. The Pulitzer Prize for Feature Writing was instead given to Teresa Carpenter, for her article in The Village Voice about the murder of Dorothy Stratten.

Of "Jimmy's World", Woodward said:

I believed it, we published it. Official questions had been raised, but we stood by the story and her. Internal questions had been raised, but none about her other work. The reports were about the story not sounding right, being based on anonymous sources, and primarily about purported lies [about] her personal life—[told by three reporters], two she had dated and one who felt in close competition with her. I think that the decision to nominate the story for a Pulitzer is of minimal consequence. I also think that it won is of little consequence. It is a brilliant story—fake and fraud that it is. It would be absurd for me or any other editor to review the authenticity or accuracy of stories that are nominated for prizes.

Gabriel García Márquez said about Cooke, "It was unfair that she won the Pulitzer prize, but also unfair that she didn't win the Nobel Prize in Literature." Cooke appeared on The Phil Donahue Show in January 1982 and said that the high-pressure environment of the Post had corrupted her judgment. She said that her sources had hinted to her about the existence of a boy such as Jimmy but, unable to find him, she eventually created a story about him to satisfy her editors.

== Later life ==
Cooke later married a lawyer who subsequently became a diplomat. The couple relocated to Paris in 1985, living there for the next decade. However, their marriage eventually ended, and Cooke said that the divorce left her impoverished. She returned to the United States, supporting herself with low-wage service jobs and financial help from her mother.

In 1996, Cooke gave an interview about the "Jimmy's World" episode to GQ reporter Mike Sager, a former Washington Post colleague whom she had dated briefly during her time there. Cooke and Sager sold the movie rights to the story to Tri-Star Pictures for $1.6 million, but the project never advanced past the script stage.

In 2016, Sager wrote in the Columbia Journalism Review that Cooke "is living within the borders of the continental United States, within a family setting, and pursuing a career that does not primarily involve writing".

== See also ==
- Jayson Blair, American journalist who fabricated stories while working for The New York Times
- Sabrina Erdely, American reporter known for her discredited Rolling Stone article
  - "A Rape on Campus", her discredited article
- Stephen Glass, American journalist of The New Republic, who published fabricated articles
- Journalistic scandal
- Jack Kelley (journalist), USA Today reporter and a finalist for the Pulitzer Prize in 2002, who employed fabrication in his international coverage
- Claas Relotius, German journalist known for fabricating multiple stories written for Der Spiegel
- Fake news
