= Jack Kelley (journalist) =

American journalist

Jack Kelley is a former reporter for USA Today. Kelley resigned in 2004 following a scandal.

== Scandal ==
Kelley is best known for his professional downfall in 2004, when it was revealed that he had long been fabricating stories, going so far as to write up scripts so associates could pretend to be sources during an investigation of his actions by others at the newspaper.

The newspaper conducted an extensive review of Kelley's stories, sending investigators (including reporter and former mid-level editor Mark Memmott) to Cuba, Israel, and Serbia to check his work and sift through stacks of hotel records to determine if Kelley was where he claimed to be when filing stories. On 26 January 2004, Nataša Kandić of the Humanitarian Law Center in Belgrade disputed his account of using her as a source for a July 1999 front-page story on a typed Yugoslav Army order to "cleanse" a village in Kosovo.

The same month, Kelley resigned but denied the charges. The USA Today publisher, Craig Moon, issued a public apology on the front page of the newspaper. The scandal led to the resignations of two key staff members at the newspaper, top editor Karen Jurgensen and News section managing editor Hal Ritter in April 2004.

== Aftermath ==
Kelley sometimes did volunteer services with Free the Children. He lives with his wife, Jacki Kelley, the global chief executive for Universal McCann, a media agency based in New York, in New Canaan, Connecticut.

== See also ==
- Journalism scandals
- Sabrina Erdely
