= Regardie's =

Business magazine in Washington, D.C.

- September 1987 issue cover, featuring annual Top 100 richest Washingtonians list
- Editor: Brian Kelly, Richard Bradley
- Staff writers: Richard Blow
- Categories: Business
- Frequency: Monthly through February 1991, then bi-monthly
- Total circulation: 50,000 (38,000 unpaid) (1991)
- Founded: 1980
- Final issue: December 1992
- Based in: Washington, D.C.
- Language: English
- ISSN: 0279-5965

Regardie's (1980–1992) was a Washington, D.C. business magazine that was published from 1980 through 1992. It was distinguished by its quirky nature, but was also able to boast about breaking a number of significant financial news stories such as a May 1990 story on the Bank of Credit and Commerce International (BCCI) and its U.S. unit, First American Bankshares, Washington, D.C.

== History ==
In 1973, William A. Regardie and his wife Renay Nadler used $5,000 to start a real estate research publication called Housing Data Reports. By 1975 they were publishing a New Homes Guide for house listings. In 1979, they started a publication called Real Estate Washington. This was revamped by William Regardie, in partnership with Randy Bartow and Michael A. DeSimone, to become Regardie's: The Business of Washington in 1980.

Popular features in Regardie's included a list of the top 100 richest people in Washington, and the "Capital Offenses" column that ran down scandals of the year.

The magazine's revenue was largely dependent on advertising. At its height, issues often reached 300 pages. By 1991, it was publishing 50,000 copies of each issue, but 38,000 were being distributed for free, and had been reduced to about 100 pages. A drop in advertising revenue also caused the magazine to move from monthly publication to bi-monthly in February 1991. By end-of-year 1991, William Regardie requested free subscribers to pay, remarking in his trademark irreverent fashion, "If you want to keep Regardie's in business, either subscribe to Regardie's today, or I'm going to mothball this sucker." The plea was unsuccessful, however, and Regardie announced he was shutting down the magazine in December 1992.

== People ==
Brian Kelly, who would become editor of U.S. News & World Report in 2007, was editor of the magazine from 1985 to 1992.

Richard Bradley, then known as Richard Blow, worked at the magazine in the 1980s, and served as editor-in-chief for the 1994-1995 editions of Regardie.

== Resurrections ==
William Regardie briefly resurrected the magazine in a black-and-white format, again published on a bi-monthly basis, edited by Richard Blow, in 1994. It shut down in 1995.

In September 1999, after selling their other publications, Regardie and Nadler started Regardie's Power, which lasted for 18 months, ending with its March/April 2001 issue.
