= Snap Judgment =

Snap Judgment may refer to:

- Snap Judgment (film), an American film of 1917
- Snap Judgment (game show), a 1967–1969 American TV game show
- Snap Judgment (TV program), a 1999–2000 American legal comedy program
- Snap Judgment (radio program), an American public radio program that debuted in 2010
- Snap Judgment (novel), a 2017 thriller novel by Marcia Clark
