= Mob Girl =

Mob Girl: A Woman's Life in the Underworld
- Author: Teresa Carpenter
- Language: English
- Genre: Non-fiction, true crime
- Published: 1992 Simon & Schuster

Mob Girl: A Woman's Life in the Underworld is 1992 non-fiction book written by Teresa Carpenter about mafia informant and mob moll Arlyne Brickman. It was published by Simon & Schuster.
