= Arlyne Brickman =

American drug trafficker and prostitute

- Born: 08 August 1933; New York City, New York, United States
- Died: 18 January 2020 (aged 85–86); Bal Harbour, Florida, United States
- Occupation: Former informant
- Children: Leslie Brickman

Arlyne Brickman (08 August 1933 – 18 January 2020) was an informant against the American Mafia.

== Biography ==
Brickman was born in New York City's Lower East Side in 1933. When growing up there, Brickman chose as her role model Virginia Hill, girlfriend of gangster Bugsy Siegel. Brickman said of Hill, "here was a broad that really made it good." As a teenager Brickman became involved with Italian mobsters, hanging out in Mafia nightclubs, seducing them in Cadillacs, and in later years running drugs. At 35, Brickman was beaten and raped by gangsters and learned none of her Mafia friends would help since she was a woman and Jewish.

According to Brickman, she turned on the mob eight years later when a loan shark threatened to hurt her eighteen-year-old daughter, Leslie, unless Brickman paid off a loan. Brickman contacted the FBI, agreeing to wear a wire, hiding the microphone in her brassiere or purse. In return, the government paid her debts and gave her a plea bargain. Over the next decade, Brickman worked as an informant and in 1986 her testimony helped convict gangster Anthony Scarpati of the Colombo crime family and several others of racketeering conspiracy. After the Scarpati trial, Brickman refused to participate in the Witness Protection Program because, in her words, "That's the quickest way to get killed."

Brickman was the subject of the 1992 non-fiction book Mob Girl: A Woman's Life in the Underworld by Teresa Carpenter, published by Simon & Schuster. Much of her family's connections were "fabricated and taken out of context", according to Brickman. Her father "was never a racketeer". "He was a true gentleman, highly respected by all that knew him". She and Carpenter had a tumultuous relationship. They never spoke again after the book was published.

Intrigued by Brickman's story, pop star Madonna reportedly picked up an option on the book for a film. The two became friends, and Madonna asked Brickman to check out the background of her New York party promoter boyfriend Peter Shue in 1994. After Shue confirmed that he was a cocaine dealer, Brickman reported him to the Drug Enforcement Administration, and they set him up to be arrested with her assistance in 1995. Brickman testified against Shue and he was convicted of drug conspiracy in 1996.

In 2008, Brickman's life was also detailed in an episode of the A&E series Mobsters, in the season 1 episode "Mobsters: Mob Ladies".

== Death ==
Brickman resided in Bal Harbour, Florida. She died in an assisted living home there in January 2020.
