= USA Today =

American national daily newspaper

- Front page (February 2, 2017)
- Type: Daily newspaper
- Format: Broadsheet
- Owner: USA Today Co.
- Founder: Al Neuharth
- Editor-in-chief: Michael McCarter
- Chief Content Officer: Kristin Roberts
- Founded: September 15, 1982; 44 years ago
- Language: English
- Headquarters: 1675 Broadway, 23rd Floor; New York City 10019
- Country: United States
- Circulation: 89,200 Average print circulation 142,212 digital-only (as of 2023)
- Sister newspapers: Newsquest
- ISSN: 0734-7456 (print); 2165-1779 (web)
- OCLC number: 8799626
- Website: usatoday.com

USA Today (often stylized in all caps) is an American daily newspaper and news broadcasting company. Founded by Al Neuharth in 1980 and launched with its first issue on September 15, 1982, the newspaper operates from USA Today Co.'s corporate headquarters in New York City. Its publication is printed across 37 locations in the U.S. and five additional facilities around the world. The paper's dynamic design influenced the style of local, regional, and national newspapers worldwide through its use of concise reports, colorized images, informational graphics, and inclusion of popular culture stories, among other distinct features.

As of 2026, USA Today attracts more than 134 million monthly website visits. It has the fourth largest print circulation in the United States, with 89,200 print subscribers. The newspaper is distributed in all 50 states, Washington, D.C., and Puerto Rico, and an international edition is distributed in Asia, Canada, Europe, and the Pacific islands.

== History ==
=== 20th century ===
USA Today was first conceived on February 29, 1980, when a company task force known as "Project nn" met with the then-chairman of Gannett, Al Neuharth, in Cocoa Beach, Florida. Early regional prototypes of USA Today included East Bay Today, an Oakland, California-based publication published in the late 1970s to serve as the morning edition of the Oakland Tribune, an afternoon newspaper that Gannett owned at the time. On June 11, 1981, Gannett printed the first prototypes of the proposed publication. The two proposed design layouts were mailed to newsmakers and prominent leaders in journalism for review and feedback. Gannett's board of directors approved the launch of the national newspaper, titled USA Today, on December 5, 1981. At launch, Neuharth was appointed president and publisher of the newspaper, adding those responsibilities to his existing position as Gannett's chief executive officer.

Gannett announced the launch of the paper on April 20, 1982. USA Today began publishing on Wednesday, September 15, 1982, initially in the Baltimore and Washington, D.C. metropolitan areas, for a newsstand price of 25¢ (equivalent to 83¢ in 2025). After selling out the first issue, Gannett gradually expanded the national distribution of the paper, reaching an estimated circulation of 362,879 copies by the end of 1982, double the amount of sales that Gannett projected.

Original logo, used from the newspaper's launch in September 1982 to September 14, 2012

The design uniquely incorporated color graphics and photographs. Initially, only its front news section pages were rendered in four-color, while the remaining pages were printed in a spot color format. The paper's overall style and elevated use of graphics—developed by Neuharth, in collaboration with staff graphics designers George Rorick, Sam Ward, Suzy Parker, John Sherlock and Web Brya—were derided by critics, who referred to it as a "McPaper" or "television you can wrap fish in", because it opted to incorporate concise nuggets of information more akin to the style of television news, rather than in-depth stories like traditional newspapers, which many in the newspaper industry considered to be a dumbing down of content. Although USA Today had been profitable for just ten years as of 1997, it changed the appearance and feel of newspapers around the world.

Gannett invested in an expensive network of printing factories and distribution during the rollout of USA Today, meaning that the paper could be printed and distributed quickly. One of the results of this was USA Today having the luxury of a later time cutoff for journalists to submit stories, such that the paper was able to include sports scores from games that finished late in the next morning's paper. The sports section of USA Today, with its complete set of results, was well-regarded and generally seen as one of the main selling points of the paper.

On July 2, 1984, the newspaper switched from predominantly black-and-white to full-color photography and graphics in all four sections. The following week, on July 10, USA Today launched an international edition intended for U.S. readers abroad, followed four months later on October 8 with the rollout of the first transmission via satellite of its international version to Singapore. On April 8, 1985, the paper published its first special bonus section, a 12-page section called "Baseball '85", which previewed the 1985 Major League Baseball season.

By the fourth quarter of 1985, USA Today had become the second-largest newspaper in the United States, reaching a daily circulation of 1.4 million copies. Total daily readership of the paper by 1987 (according to Simmons Market Research Bureau statistics) had reached 5.5 million, the largest of any daily newspaper in the U.S. On May 6, 1986, USA Today began production of its international edition in Switzerland. USA Today operated at a loss for most of its first four years of operation, accumulating a total deficit of $233 million after taxes. According to figures released by Gannett in July 1987, the newspaper began turning its first profit in May 1987, six months ahead of Gannett's corporate revenue projections.

On January 29, 1988, USA Today published the largest edition in its history, a 78-page weekend edition featuring a section previewing Super Bowl XXII; the edition included 44.38 pages of advertising and sold 2,114,055 copies, setting a single-day record for an American newspaper (and surpassed seven months later on September 2, when its Labor Day weekend edition sold 2,257,734 copies). On April 15, USA Today launched a third international printing site, based in Hong Kong. The international edition set circulation and advertising records during August 1988, with coverage of the 1988 Summer Olympics, selling more than 60,000 copies and 100 pages of advertising.

In January 1989, USA Today started its survey of television commercials during the Super Bowl, known as the Super Bowl Ad Meter.

By July 1991, Simmons Market Research Bureau estimated that USA Today had a total daily readership of nearly 6.6 million, an all-time high and the largest readership of any daily newspaper in the United States. On September 1, 1991, USA Today launched a fourth print site for its international edition in London for the United Kingdom and the British Isles. The international edition's schedule was changed as of April 1, 1994, to Monday through Friday, rather than from Tuesday through Saturday, in order to accommodate business travelers; on February 1, 1995, USA Today opened its first editorial bureau outside the United States at its Hong Kong publishing facility; additional editorial bureaus were launched in London and Moscow in 1996.

On April 17, 1995, USA Today launched its website to provide real-time news coverage; in June 2002, the site expanded to include a section providing travel information and booking tools. On August 28, 1995, a fifth international publishing site was launched in Frankfurt, Germany, to print and distribute the international edition throughout most of Europe.

On October 4, 1999, USA Today began running advertisements on its front page for the first time. In 2017, some pages of USA Today's website features Auto-Play functionality for video or audio-aided stories.

=== 21st century ===
On February 8, 2000, Gannett launched USA Today Live, a broadcast and Internet initiative designed to provide coverage from the newspaper to broadcast television stations nationwide for use in their local newscasts and their websites; the venture also provided integration with the USA Today website, which transitioned from a text-based format to feature audio and video clips of news content.

The paper launched a sixth printing site for its international edition on May 15, 2000, in Milan, Italy, followed on July 10 by the launch of an international printing facility in Charleroi, Belgium.

In 2001, two interactive units were launched: on June 19, USA Today and Gannett Newspapers launched the USA Today Careers Network (now Careers.com), a website featuring localized employment listings, then on July 18, the USA Today News Center was launched as an interactive television news service developed through a joint venture with the On Command Corporation that was distributed to hotels around the United States. On September 12 of that year, the newspaper set an all-time single day circulation record, selling 3,638,600 copies for its edition covering the September 11 attacks. That November, USA Today migrated its operations from Gannett's previous corporate headquarters in Arlington, Virginia, to the company's next headquarters in nearby McLean. The company moved its headquarters to New York, NY in 2024. In 2004, Jack Kelley, a senior foreign correspondent for USA Today, was found to have fabricated foreign news reports over the past decade. Kelley resigned.

On December 12, 2005, Gannett announced that it would combine the separate newsroom operations of the online and print entities of USA Today, with USAToday.com's vice president and editor-in-chief Kinsey Wilson promoted to co-executive editor, alongside existing executive editor John Hillkirk.

In December 2010, USA Today launched the USA Today API for sharing data with partners of all types.

=== Newsroom restructuring and 2011 graphical tweaks ===
On August 27, 2010, USA Today announced that it would undergo a reorganization of its newsroom, announcing the layoffs of 130 staffers. It also announced that the paper would shift its focus away from print and place more emphasis on its digital platforms (including USAToday.com and its related mobile applications) and launch of a new publication called USA Today Sports.

On January 24, 2011, to reverse a revenue slide, the paper introduced a tweaked format that modified the appearance of its front section pages, which included a larger logo at the top of each page; coloring tweaks to section front pages; a new sans-serif font, called Prelo, for certain headlines of main stories (replacing the Gulliver typeface that had been implemented for story headers in April 2000); an updated "Newsline" feature featuring larger, "newsier" headline entry points; and the increasing and decreasing of mastheads and white space to present a cleaner style.

=== 2012 redesign ===
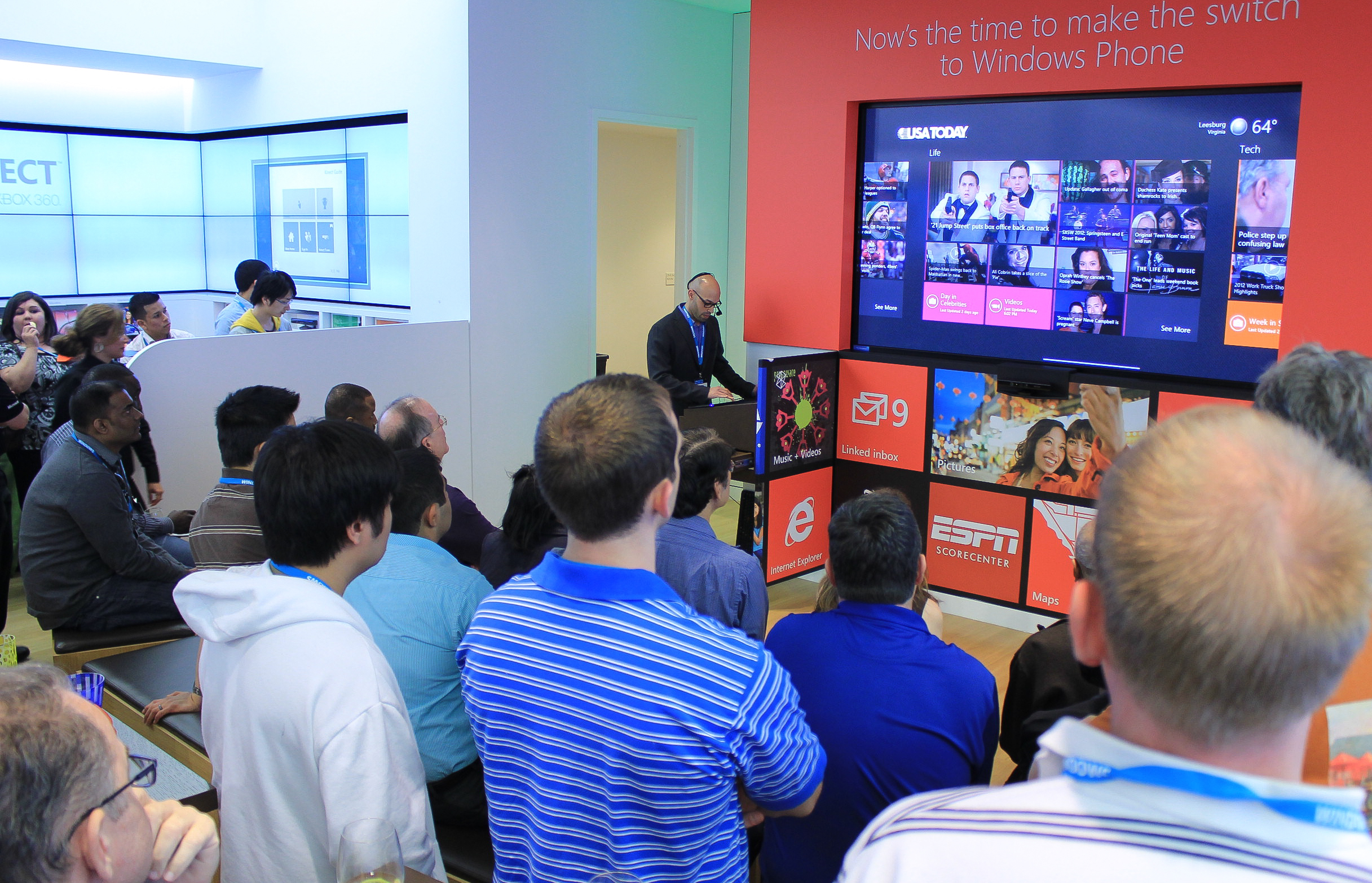
Miguel Vazquez from USA Today shows off the publication's Metro App, 2012.

On September 14, 2012, USA Today underwent the first major redesign in its history, in commemoration for the 30th anniversary of the paper's first edition. Developed in conjunction with brand design firm Wolff Olins, the print edition of USA Today added a page covering technology stories, expanded travel coverage within the Life section, and increased the number of color pages included in each edition, while retaining longtime elements. The "globe" logo used since the paper's inception was replaced with a new logo featuring a large circle rendered in colors corresponding to each of the sections, serving as an infographic that changes with news stories, containing images representing that day's top stories.

The paper's website was also extensively overhauled using a new, in-house content management system known as Presto and a design created by Fantasy Interactive, that incorporates flipboard-style navigation to switch between individual stories (which obscure most of the main and section pages), clickable video advertising and a responsive design layout. The site was designed and developed to be more interactive, faster, provide "high impact" advertising units (known as Gravity), and provide the ability for Gannett to syndicate USA Today content to the websites of its local properties, and vice versa. To accomplish this goal, Gannett Digital migrated its newspaper and television station websites to the Presto platform. Developers built a separate platform to provide optimizations for mobile and touchscreen devices. The Gravity ad won Digiday's Best Publishing Innovation in Advertising in 2016, thanks to an 80% full-watch user engagement rate on desktop, and 96% on mobile.

Following the relaunch, the editorial team behind USA Today Investigations ramped up its "longread" article plans, following the success of the series Ghost Factories. With differing platform requirements, USA Today's mobile website did not offer any specialized support for these multi-chapter stories. Nearing the end of 2012, more than one-third of USA Today's readership was browsing only using their mobile phones, and the majority of these users were accessing the mobile website (as opposed to the iOS and Android applications) with the newer, less-obtrusive advertising strategy. Gannet Digital designed, developed, and released the longread mobile experience to coincide with the launch of Brad Heath's series Locked Up, which won the Investigative Reporters and Editors Tom Renner Award in October 2013.

Gannett Digital's focus on its mobile content experience paid off in 2012 with multiple awards; including the Eppy for Best Mobile Application, the Mobile Excellence award for Best User Experience, the MOBI award for Editorial Content, and Mobile Publisher of the Year.

The USA Today site design was launched on desktop, mobile and TV throughout 2013 and 2014, although archive content accessible through search engines remains available through the pre-relaunch design.

=== Mid-2010s expansion and restructuring ===
On October 6, 2013, Gannett test launched a condensed daily edition of USA Today (part of what was internally known within Gannett as the "Butterfly" initiative) for distribution as an insert in four of its newspapers – The Indianapolis Star, the Rochester Democrat & Chronicle, the Fort Myers-based The News-Press and the Appleton, Wisconsin-based The Post-Crescent. The launch of the syndicated insert caused USA Today to restructure its operations to allow seven-day-a-week production to accommodate the packaging of its national and international news content and enterprise stories (comprising about 10 pages for the weekday and Saturday editions, and up to 22 pages for the Sunday edition) into the pilot insert. Gannett later announced on December 11, that it would formally launch the condensed daily edition of USA Today in 31 additional local newspapers nationwide through April 2014 (with the Palm Springs, California-based The Desert Sun and the Lafayette, Louisiana-based Advertiser being the first newspapers outside of the pilot program participants to add the supplement on December 15), citing "positive feedback" to the feature from readers and advertisers of the initial four papers. Gannett was given permission from the Alliance for Audited Media to count the circulation figures from the syndicated local insert with the total circulation count for the flagship national edition of USA Today.

On January 4, 2014, USA Today acquired the consumer product review website Reviewed. In the first quarter of 2014, Gannett launched a condensed USA Today insert into 31 other newspapers in its network, thereby increasing the number of inserts to 35, in an effort to shore up circulation after it regained its position as the highest-circulated weekday newspaper in the United States in October 2013. On September 3, 2014, USA Today announced that it would lay off roughly 70 employees in a restructuring of its newsroom and business operations. In October 2014, USA Today and OpenWager Inc. entered into a partnership to release a Bingo mobile app called USA Today Bingo Cruise.

On December 3, 2015, Gannett formally launched the USA Today Network, a national digital newsgathering service providing shared content between USA Today and the company's 92 local newspapers throughout the United States as well as pooling advertising services on both a hyperlocal and national scale. The Courier Journal had earlier soft-launched the service as part of a pilot program started on November 17, coinciding with an imaging rebrand for the Louisville, Kentucky-based newspaper; Gannett's other local newspaper properties, as well as those it acquired through its merger with the Journal Media Group, gradually began identifying themselves as part of the USA Today Network (foregoing use of the Gannett name outside of requisite ownership references) through early January 2016.

In the late 2010s, as the print run declined, Gannett pulled back from the extensive and expensive distribution network, opting to have shorter deadlines, and printing the remaining copies from fewer facilities while potentially trucking them longer distances to still be available in the morning.

In May 2021, USA Today introduced a paywall for some of its online stories.

On June 16, 2022, it was reported that USA Today removed 23 articles written by journalist Gabriela Miranda after an inquiry related to one of her articles triggered an internal investigation and found that Miranda had fabricated sources on articles pertaining to the Texas Heartbeat Act, Ukrainian women's issues due to the Russian invasion of Ukraine, and an article on sunscreen. Miranda resigned.

On November 4, 2025, Gannett announced that it would change their name to the USA Today Co. on November 18, 2025, changing its ticker symbol from GCI to TDAY, due to their ownership of the USA Today newspaper.

== Layout and format ==
Cover page used for February 5, 2009

In the main edition of the paper circulated in the United States and Canada, each edition consists of four sections: News (the "front page" section), Money, Sports, and Life. Since March 1998, the Friday edition of Life has been split into two sections: the regular Life focusing on entertainment (subtitled Weekend; section E), which features television reviews and listings, a DVD column, film reviews and trends, and a travel supplement called Destinations & Diversions (section D). The international edition of the paper features two sections: News and Money in one, and Sports and Life in the other.

The paper does not print on Saturdays and Sundays; the Friday edition serves as the weekend edition. USA Today has published special Saturday and Sunday editions in the past: the first issue released during the standard calendar weekend was published on January 19, 1991, when it released a Saturday "Extra" edition updating coverage of the Gulf War from the previous day; the paper published special seven-day-a-week editions for the first time on July 19, 1996, when it published special editions for exclusive distribution in the host city of Atlanta and surrounding areas for the two-week duration of the 1996 Summer Olympics. USA Today prints each complete story on the front page of the respective section, with the exception of the cover story. The cover story is a longer story that requires a jump (readers must turn to another page in the paper to complete the story, usually the next page of that section). On certain days, the news or sports section, will take up two paper sections, and there will be a second cover story within the second section.

Each section is differentiated by a certain color in a box on the top-left corner of the first page; the principal section colors are blue for News (section A), green for Money (section B), red for Sports (section C), and purple for Life (section D); in the paper's early years, the Life and Money sections were also assigned blue nameplates and spot colors, as the presses used at USA Today's printing facilities did not yet accommodate the use of other colors to denote all four original sections. Orange is used for bonus sections (sections E+), which are published occasionally for business travel trends and the Olympics. Other bonus sections for sports (such as for the PGA Tour preview, NCAA basketball tournaments, Memorial Day auto races (Indianapolis 500 and Coca-Cola 600), NFL opening weekend and the Super Bowl) previously used the orange color, but later changed to the regular sports red in their sports bonus sections. To strengthen their association with USA Today, Gannett incorporated the USA Today color scheme into a standardized broadcast graphics package that was phased in across its television station group (which was spun off in July 2015 into the separate broadcast and digital media company Tegna) starting in late 2012. The package used the color scheme in a rundown graphic on most stations, persisting throughout their newscasts, as well as bumpers for individual story topics.

Unlike other papers, the left-hand quarter of each section are "reefers" (front-page paragraphs referring to stories on inside pages), sometimes using sentence-length blurbs to describe stories inside. The lead reefer is the cover page feature "Newsline", which shows summarized descriptions of headline stories featured in all four main sections and any special sections. As a national newspaper, USA Today cannot focus on the weather for any one city. Therefore, the entire back page of the News section is used for weather maps of the continental United States, Puerto Rico and the U.S. Virgin Islands, as well as temperature lists for many cities throughout the U.S. and the world. Temperatures for individual cities on the primary forecast map and temperature lists are suffixed with a one- or two-letter code, such as "t" for thunderstorms, referencing the expected weather conditions. The colorized forecast map was created by staff designer George Rorick (who left USA Today for a similar position at The Detroit News in 1986) and was copied by newspapers around the world, breaking from the traditional style of monochrome contouring or simplistic text to denote temperature ranges. National precipitation maps for the next three days (the next five days before the 2012 redesign) and four-day forecasts and air quality indexes for 36 major U.S. cities (16 cities prior to 1999), with individual cities color-coded by the temperature contour corresponding to the given area on the forecast map, are also featured. Weather data is provided by AccuWeather, which has served as the forecast provider for USA Today for most of the paper's existence (except from January 2002 to September 2012, when forecast data was provided by The Weather Channel through a long-term multimedia content agreement with Gannett). In the bottom left-hand corner of the weather page is "Weather Focus", a graphic which explains various meteorological phenomena. On some days, the Weather Focus could be a photo of a rare meteorological event.

On business holidays or days when bonus sections are included in the issue, the Money and Life sections are usually combined into one section, while combinations of the Friday Life editions into one section are common during quiet weeks. Advertising is often covered in the Monday Money section, with a review of a recent television ad, and after Super Bowl Sunday, a review of the ads aired during the broadcast with the results of the Ad Track live survey. Stock tables for individual stock exchanges (comprising one subsection for companies traded on the New York Stock Exchange, and another for companies trading on NASDAQ and the American Stock Exchange) and mutual indexes were discontinued with the 2012 redesign due to the myriad electronic ways to check individual stock prices, in line with most newspapers.

Book coverage, including reviews and a bestseller list which debuted on October 28, 1994, is seen on Thursdays in Life, with the full A.C. Nielsen television ratings chart printed on Wednesdays or Thursdays, depending on release. The paper also publishes the Mediabase survey for several genres of music based on radio airplay on Tuesdays, along with their own chart of the top ten singles in general on Wednesdays. Because of the same limitations as its nationalized forecasts, the television page in Life, which provides prime time and late night listings (running from 8:00 p.m. to 12:30 a.m. Eastern Time), incorporates boilerplate "Local news" or "Local programming" descriptions to denote time periods in which the five major English language broadcast networks (ABC, NBC, CBS, Fox and The CW) cede airtime to allow their owned and affiliated stations to carry syndicated programs or local newscasts. The television page has never carried local scheduling information similar to those in local newspapers. Like most national papers, USA Today has no comic strips, although certain Gannett newspapers publish comics.

One of the staples of the News section is "Across the USA", a state-by-state roundup of headlines. The summaries consist of paragraph-length Associated Press reports highlighting one story in each state, the District of Columbia, and one U.S. territory. Similarly, the "For the Record" page of the Sports section (which features sports scores for the previous four days of league play plus individual non-league events, seasonal league statistics and wagering lines for that day's games) previously featured a rundown of winning numbers from the previous deadline date for all participating state lotteries and individual multi-state lotteries.

Some traditions have been retained. The lead story still appears on the upper-right side of the front page. Commentary and political cartoons occupy the last few pages of the News section. Stock and mutual fund data are presented in the Money section. But USA Today is sufficiently different in aesthetics to be recognized on sight, even in a mix of other newspapers, such as at a newsstand. The overall design and layout of USA Today have been described as neo-Victorian.

The newspaper also features an occasional magazine supplement called Open Air, which launched on March 7, 2008, and appears several times a year. Other advertorials appear throughout the year, mainly on Fridays.

=== Opinion section ===
The opinion section prints USA Today editorials, columns by guest writers and members of the editorial board of contributors, letters to the editor, and editorial cartoons. One unique feature of the USA Today editorial page is the publication of opposing points of view: alongside the editorial board's piece on the day's topic runs an opposing view by a guest writer, often an expert in the field. The Board of Contributors, which is distinct from the paper's news staff, chooses the opinion pieces that appear in each edition.

From 1999 to 2002 and again from 2004 to 2015, the editorial page editor was Brian Gallagher, who has worked for the newspaper since its founding. Other members of the editorial board included deputy editorial page editor Bill Sternberg, executive forum editor John Siniff, op-ed/forum page editor Glen Nishimura, operations editor Thuan Le Elston, letters editor Michelle Poblete, web content editor Eileen Rivers, and editorial writers Dan Carney, George Hager, and Saundra Torry. The newspaper's website calls this group "demographically and ideologically diverse".

Beginning with the 1984 United States presidential election, USA Today did not endorse candidates for the President of the United States or any other state or federal political office, a policy which has been re-evaluated during each four-year election cycle by the paper's Board of Contributors through an independent process, with any decision to override the policy based on a consensus vote in which fewer than two of the editorial board's members dissent or hold differing opinions. For most of its history, the paper's political editorials (most of them linked to the presidential election cycle) had focused instead on major issues based on the differing concerns of voters.

The avoidance of political editorials played a great part in USA Today's long-standing reputation for "fluff", but after its 30th anniversary revamp, the paper took a more active stance on political issues, calling for stronger gun laws after the Sandy Hook Elementary School shooting in 2012. It heavily criticized the Republican Party for both the 2013 government shutdown and the 2015 revolts in the United States House of Representatives that ended with the resignation of John Boehner as House Speaker. It also published opinion content that criticized then-President Barack Obama and other top members of the Democratic Party for what it perceived as "inaction" during 2013–14, particularly over the NSA scandal and the ISIL beheading incidents.

The editorial board broke from its "non-endorsement" policy for the first time on September 29, 2016, when it published a column condemning the candidacy of Republican nominee Donald Trump, calling him "unfit for the presidency" due to his inflammatory campaign rhetoric (particularly that aimed at the press. The board wrote that the piece was not a "qualified endorsement" of Democratic nominee Hillary Clinton, for whom it was unable to reach a consensus (some editorial board members expressed that Clinton's public service record would help her "serve the nation ably as its president", while others had "serious reservations about [her] sense of entitlement, [...] lack of candor and... extreme carelessness in handling classified information"), suggesting instead tactical voting against Trump and GOP seats in swing states, advising voters to decide whether to vote for either Clinton, Libertarian nominee Gary Johnson, Green Party nominee Jill Stein or a write-in candidate for president; or to focus on Senate, House and other down-ballot political races.

In February 2018, USA Today published an op-ed by Jerome Corsi, the Washington, D.C. bureau chief for the fringe conspiracy website InfoWars. Corsi, a prominent conspiracy theorist, was described by USA Today as an "author" and "investigative journalist". Corsi was a prominent proponent of the false conspiracy theory that Barack Obama was not a U.S. citizen, and Infowars has promoted conspiracy theories such as 9/11 being an "inside job".

In October 2018, USA Today was criticized by NBC News for publishing an editorial by President Trump that was replete with inaccuracies. The Washington Post fact-checker said that "almost every sentence contained a misleading statement or a falsehood."

In 2020, USA Today endorsed a presidential candidate for the first time, Democratic nominee Joe Biden. The newspaper also published an opposing editorial by Vice President Mike Pence, which called for his and Trump's re-election.

USA Today was the only one of 42 prominent American daily newspapers rated as "moderate" by the Boston University Library (all the others were rated as "leans liberal" or "leans conservative"), based on their editorial endorsements in the 2012 presidential election.

== Personnel ==
In May 2012, Larry Kramer, a 40-year media industry veteran and former president of CBS Digital Media, was appointed president and publisher of USA Today, replacing David Hunke, who had been publisher of the newspaper since 2009. Kramer was tasked with developing a new strategy for the paper as it sought to increase revenue from its digital operations.

In July 2012, Kramer hired David Callaway, whom he had hired as lead editor of MarketWatch in 1999, two years after Kramer founded that website, as the paper's editor-in-chief. Callaway had previously worked at Bloomberg News covering banking, investment-banking, and asset management businesses throughout Europe, and at the Boston Herald, where he co-wrote a daily financial column on "comings and goings in the Boston business district".

The editor-in-chief as of September 2024 is Caren Bohan.

== Related publications and services ==
=== USA Weekend ===
USA Weekend was a sister publication that launched in 1953 as Family Weekly, a national Sunday magazine supplement intended for the Sunday editions of U.S. newspapers. It adopted its final title following Gannett's purchase of the magazine in 1985. The magazine was distributed to approximately 800 newspapers nationwide at its peak, with most Gannett-owned local newspapers carrying it by default within their Sunday editions. It focused on social issues, entertainment, health, food and travel. On December 5, 2014, Gannett announced the end of USA Weekend after the December 26–28, 2014 edition, citing increasing operational costs and reduced advertising revenue. Most of its participating newspapers replaced it with the competing Sunday magazine Parade.

=== USA Today Sports Weekly ===
USA Today Sports Weekly is a weekly magazine that covers news and statistics from Major League Baseball, Minor League Baseball, NCAA baseball, the National Football League (NFL), and NASCAR. It debuted on April 5, 1991, as USA Today Baseball Weekly, a tabloid-sized publication published weekly on Wednesdays during the baseball season and bi-weekly during the off-season. The magazine expanded its sports coverage on September 4, 2002, adopting a general title after adding stories about the NFL. Sports Weekly added coverage of NASCAR on February 15, 2006, which lasted only through that year's race season. It added coverage of NCAA college football on August 8, 2007. The editorial operations of Sports Weekly operated independently from USA Today until being integrated into the newspaper's sports department in late 2005.

=== The Big Lead ===
The Big Lead is a sports blog operated by USA Today that was launched in February 2006 by Fantasy Sports Ventures, co-founded by Jason McIntyre and David Lessa. In April 2008, the blog established a strategic content and marketing partnership with Gannett. Gannett purchased The Big Lead in January 2012. The site is usually updated 10 to 15 times per day between 8:00 a.m. and 6:00 p.m. Eastern Time. It mainly covers sports but also provides news and commentary on other news topics, ranging from politics to pop culture.

=== USA Today: The Television Show ===
In 1987, Gannett and producer/former NBC CEO Grant Tinker began developing a news magazine series for broadcast syndication that attempted to bring the breezy style of USA Today to television. The result was USA Today: The Television Show (later USA Today on TV, then shortened to simply USA Today), which premiered on September 12, 1988. Correspondents on the program included Edie Magnus, Robin Young, Boyd Matson, Kenneth Walker, Dale Harimoto, Ann Abernathy, Bill Macatee and Beth Ruyak. As with the newspaper, the show was divided into four "sections" corresponding to the respective parts of the paper: News (the major headlines), Money (financial news and consumer reports), Sports (sports news and scores) and Life (entertainment and lifestyle stories). The series was syndicated by GTG Marketing, a subsidiary of GTG Entertainment, which promoted it as a prime access magazine show, hoping that stations would air it in a prime-time slot.

Throughout its run, the series received poor reviews and low ratings. From the beginning, there was concern. After one week, Henry Siegel, owner of LBS Communications, called the show a "calamity" and among the most disastrous debuts in syndication history. The program also suffered from being scheduled in poor timeslots in certain markets, like New York City, the country's largest media market, where WCBS-TV aired the program at 2:05 a.m., dragging down the national ratings, before canceling it in February 1989. It was then picked up by WNBC; after airing in the equally weak 5:30 a.m. slot, the series was moved to the more clear-eyed 9:30 a.m., but fared no better (in contrast, CITY-DT in Toronto ran it at 5:00 p.m.). Other stations quickly canceled or downgraded the program's airings as it became clear that it was a dud; the original executive producer was fired and the show retooled with Magnus and Macatee as anchors and a new on-air look and sound. The series was renewed for a second season, but the setbacks led to the mid-season cancellation of the TV version of USA Today in November 1989, after one-and-a-half seasons. The final edition aired on January 7, 1990. The cancellation, a $13 million loss for GTG, was believed to make the show the costliest failure in syndication history.

Gannett announced plans to develop a USA Today-branded weekly half-hour television program titled Sports Page as part of a renewed initiative to extend the brand into television, but this program, planned for fall 2004, never launched.

=== VRtually There ===
VRtually There was a weekly virtual reality news program produced by the USA Today Network, which debuted on October 20, 2016. The program, which was carried on the USA Today mobile app and is still available on YouTube, showcased three original segments outlining news stories through a first-person perspective, recorded and produced by journalists from USA Today and its co-owned local newspapers. The program included "cubemercials", lengthy commercials made by Gannett's in-house creative studio, GET Creative, with the goal of enabling consumer engagement in totally immersive experiences through virtual reality. The last story was uploaded on August 1, 2017, less than a year after the series was created.

=== For the Win ===
USA Today operates a sports website called For the Win. It was launched in April 2013 and was the first sports property devoted to social news. The sports and sports leagues/organizations covered are the National Football League (NFL), the National Basketball Association (NBA), the Women's National Basketball Association (WNBA), National Hockey League (NHL), Major League Baseball (MLB), college football, college basketball, motorsports, soccer, golf, outdoor sports, and the African-American cable television network BET. A gateway to TicketSmarter to purchase sports and other event tickets is also hosted.

For the Win has sections covering pop culture and video games. Some articles for the latter are contributed by Good Luck Have Fun (GLHF), which describes itself as a gaming content agency that provides publishers around the globe, such as USA Today and Sports Illustrated, with text and video.

=== Over-the-top and FAST channels ===
In 2018, Gannett launched USA Today-branded over-the-top channels, USA Today News and USA Today SportsWire (later renamed as USA Today Sports), which then were relaunched in 2021 as free ad-supported streaming television (FAST) channels available on Tubi, The Roku Channel, Xumo Play, Plex, Amazon Freevee, Local Now and Samsung TV Plus.

== Award programs ==
- USA Today Minor League Player of the Year Award: First presented in 1988, this annual award has been given to a Minor league baseball player judged to have had the most outstanding season by a thirteen-person panel of baseball experts.
- USA Today All-USA High School Baseball Team: First presented in 1998, the award honors between nine and eleven outstanding high school baseball players from around the United States with selection to the team (separate awards honoring the High School Baseball Player of the Year and High School Baseball Coach of the Year have been given since 1989).
- USA Today All-USA High School Basketball Team: First presented in 1983, the award honors outstanding male and female basketball players from high schools around the United States with selection to the team, with one member of each team being named High School Basketball Player of the Year as well as coaches from a select boys' and girls' team as High School Basketball Coach of the Year.
- USA Today All-Joe Team (NFL): First presented in 1992 in tribute to Kansas City Chiefs veteran defensive lineman Joe Phillips, the award honors 52 players across the NFL for exemplary performance during their rookie season.
- USA Today/National Prep Poll High School Football National Championship: Predating the first publication of USA Today under the sole decision of the National Prep Poll, it is a national championship honor awarded to the best high school football team(s) in the United States, based on rankings by the newspaper's sports editorial department.
- USA Today All-USA High School Football Team: First presented in 1982, the award honors outstanding football players from high schools around the United States (including ranking the Super 25 teams in the U.S., the Top 10 teams in the East, South, Midwest, and West, and USA Today High School Football Player of the Year).
- USA Today High School Football Coach of the Year – First presented in 1982, it is awarded to a coach of one of the teams selected for the All-USA football team.
- USA Today Road Warrior of the Year only presented once, to Joyce Gioia in 2013.

== In popular culture ==
- In 1986, the satirical magazine The Harvard Lampoon published an issue that featured a parody of USA Today.
- Back to the Future Part II (1989) depicts a Hill Valley edition of USA Today from October 22, 2015. On that eventual date, the newspaper ran a recreation of the front page in tribute to the film, featuring the same headlines (sans a piece mentioning a state visit by "Queen Diana", the princess having died in 1997).
- A 1991 episode of The Simpsons ("Homer Defined") featured a parody of the paper ("U.S. of A. News"), whose lead story was "#2 is #1", in reference to pencils. Lisa criticizes the paper's blandness, but Homer retorts, "Hey, this is the only paper in America that's not afraid to tell the truth, that everything is just fine."
- A 2010 episode of Futurama ("A Clockwork Origin") featured a parody of the paper ("USB Today"). The paper was also parodied on the 2007 direct-to-DVD special "Bender's Big Score" as "USA Toady", possibly as a reference to the character Hypnotoad.
- Total Recall (1990) featured the Mars Today newspaper in the film's Mars setting.
- The 2004 mockumentary feature film C.S.A.: The Confederate States of America, directed by Kevin Willmott, featured a parody of the newspaper titled CSA Today, in the film's fictional alternate history setting that the Confederacy had won the American Civil War.

== See also ==
- USA Today Super Bowl Ad Meter
- Viewtron
- USA Today journalists
