= Marcia Clark =

American prosecutor, author, television correspondent, and producer

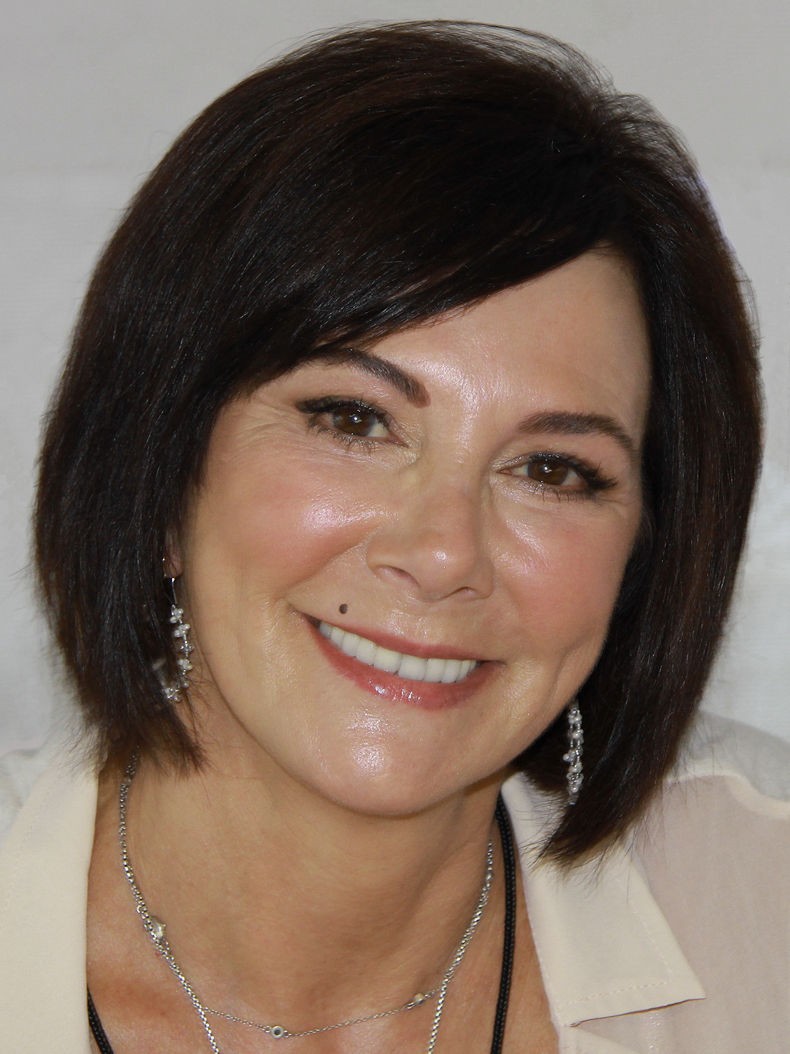
- Clark at the 2011 Texas Book Festival
- Born: Marcia Rachel Kleks; August 31, 1953 (age 73); Alameda, California, U.S.
- Education: University of California, Los Angeles (BA); Southwestern Law School (JD)
- Occupations: Prosecutor; writer; television correspondent
- Years active: 1979–present
- Spouses: Gabriel Horowitz (m. 1976; div. 1980); Gordon Tolls Clark (m. 1980; div. 1995)
- Children: 2

Marcia Rachel Clark (née Kleks, formerly Horowitz; born August 31, 1953) is an American prosecutor, author, television correspondent, and television producer. She was the lead prosecutor in the O. J. Simpson murder case.

== Early life and education ==
Clark was born Marcia Rachel Kleks on August 31, 1953, in Alameda, California the daughter of Rozlyn (née Masur) and Abraham Kleks. Both of her parents are of Jewish origins. Her father was born in Mandatory Palestine and raised there and in Israel, and worked as a chemist for the FDA. Because of her father's job, the family moved several times, including living in California, New York, Michigan, and Maryland.

Clark graduated from Susan E. Wagner High School, a public school in the Manor Heights section of Staten Island, New York City. She studied at the University of California, Los Angeles, graduating in 1976 with a degree in political science, and then earned a Juris Doctor degree at Southwestern University School of Law.

== Career ==
=== Attorney ===
Clark was admitted to the State Bar of California in 1979, where she continued to practice law. She worked in private practice and as a public defender for the city of Los Angeles before she became a prosecutor in 1981. She worked as a deputy district attorney for Los Angeles County, California and was mentored by prosecutor Harvey Giss.

Clark is well known as the lead prosecutor in the 1995 trial of O. J. Simpson for the murders of his ex-wife Nicole Brown Simpson and her friend Ron Goldman. Prior to the Simpson trial, Clark's highest-profile trial occurred in 1991 when she prosecuted Robert John Bardo for the murder of television star Rebecca Schaeffer. Clark said that the media attention that she received during the trial was "the hell of the trial," calling herself "famous in a way that was kind of terrifying." Clark was advised by a jury consultant to "talk softer, dress softer, wear pastels" in order to improve her image. She subsequently changed her hairstyle into a perm, and the Los Angeles Times described her as resembling "Sigourney Weaver, only more professional." The New York Times commented that "the transformation was not entirely seamless."

=== Commentator and author ===
Clark resigned from the district attorney's office after she lost the Simpson case. She and Teresa Carpenter wrote a book about the Simpson case, Without a Doubt, in a deal reported to be worth $4.2 million.

Since the Simpson trial, Clark has made numerous appearances on television, including as a special correspondent for Entertainment Tonight. She provided coverage of high-profile trials and reported from the red carpet at awards shows such as the Emmy Awards. She was a guest attorney on the short-lived television series Power of Attorney and was also featured on Headline News analyzing the Casey Anthony trial. In July 2013, Clark provided commentary for CNN during the Florida trial of George Zimmerman.

Clark wrote a pilot script for a television series called Borderland, centering on "a very dark version of the DA's office." The series was purchased by FX but was never produced. Clark has contributed true-crime articles to The Daily Beast.

Clark has written several novels. Her "Rachel Knight" series centers on a prosecutor in the Los Angeles district attorney's office, and includes Guilt By Association (2011), Guilt By Degrees (2012), Killer Ambition (2013) and The Competition (2014). Guilt by Association was adapted as a television pilot for TNT in 2014.

Clark's "Samantha Brinkman" series features a female defense attorney. It includes Blood Defense (2016), Moral Defense (2016) and Snap Judgment (2017), and was planned as a television adaptation series for NBC that Clark would cowrite. Clark did not expect to become an author, saying, "As a lawyer, I came to understand early that storytelling plays a very important part when you address a jury. So I guess my instincts have always kind of been there when it comes to weaving a narrative." She read Nancy Drew and The Hardy Boys mystery fiction as a child and said "I have been addicted to crime since I was born. I was making up crime stories when I was a 4 or 5-year-old kid."

== Media appearances ==
In August 2013, Clark appeared as attorney Sidney Barnes in the Pretty Little Liars episode on Freeform (formally ABC) titled "Now You See Me, Now You Don't".

In 2015, Clark was parodied on the sitcom Unbreakable Kimmy Schmidt through the character Marcia, implied to represent Marcia Clark in a relationship with Chris Darden. The character portrayed by Tina Fey, whose performance earned her a Primetime Emmy Award for Outstanding Guest Actress in a Comedy Series for the role.

Clark appears in the 2016 documentary miniseries O.J.: Made in America. That same year, she was portrayed by Sarah Paulson in the 2016 television series The People v. O. J. Simpson: American Crime Story, which focuses on the Simpson trial. Paulson's performance as Clark earned wide acclaim, and she earned a Primetime Emmy Award and a Golden Globe Award for the role. Clark attended the Emmy Awards with Paulson on September 18, 2016. Katey Rich wrote in Vanity Fair that the series positions Clark as a "feminist hero."

In 2019, Clark appeared in the 18th season finale of Gordon Ramsay's reality series Hell's Kitchen as a VIP guest diner for winner and season 6 veteran Ariel Contreras-Fox.

In 2024, Clark appeared on the third episode of comedian John Mulaney’s live comedy special Everybody’s in LA. While the episode was themed to and titled "Helicopters," much of the discussion focused around the 1994 O.J. Simpson trial due to the presence of Clark and reporter Zoey Tur, who famously captured helicopter footage of the slow-speed Bronco chase. Clark and Tur had never met before their appearance on the show.

== Personal life ==
When Clark was 17 years old, she was raped on a trip to Israel. She has said that it was an experience with which she did not deal until later in life and that it greatly influenced her decision to become a prosecutor.

In 1976, Clark married Gabriel Horowitz, an Israeli professional backgammon player whom she had met as a student at UCLA. They obtained a "Mexican divorce" in 1980 and had no children. Horowitz was briefly in the news after he sold topless photos of Clark to the National Enquirer during the Simpson trial.

In 1980, Clark married her second husband, Gordon Clark, a computer programmer and systems administrator who was employed at the Church of Scientology. They were divorced in 1995 and had two sons. Gordon argued at a custody hearing during the Simpson trial that he should receive full custody of their children given the long hours that Marcia had spent working for the trial.

Clark no longer considers herself religious, although she was raised Jewish and her first wedding was a Conservative Jewish ceremony. She was a member of the Church of Scientology until 1980.

Clark resides in Calabasas, California.

== Bibliography ==
=== Non-fiction ===
- Without a Doubt with Teresa Carpenter (1997). Viking Press. ISBN 978-0-670-87089-9
- Trial by Ambush: Murder, Injustice, and the Truth about the Case of Barbara Graham (2024). Thomas & Mercer. ISBN 978-1-662-51596-5

=== Rachel Knight series ===
- Guilt By Association (2011). Mulholland Books. ISBN 978-0-316-12951-0
- Guilt By Degrees (2012). Mulholland Books. ISBN 978-0-316-12953-4
- Killer Ambition (2013). Mulholland Books. ISBN 978-0-316-22094-1
- The Competition (2014). Mulholland Books. ISBN 978-0-316-22097-2
- If I'm Dead: A Rachel Knight Story (2012). Mulholland Books. Digital.
- Trouble in Paradise: A Rachel Knight Story (2013). Mulholland Books. Digital.

=== Samantha Brinkman series ===
- Blood Defense (2016). Thomas & Mercer. ISBN 978-1-503-93619-5
- Moral Defense (2016). Thomas & Mercer. ISBN 978-1-503-93977-6
- Snap Judgment (2017). Thomas & Mercer. ISBN 978-1-542-04599-5
- Final Judgment (2020). Thomas & Mercer. ISBN 978-1-542-09117-6
