= Richard Bradley (writer) =

American writer and journalist

Richard Bradley (born Richard Blow; 1964) is an American writer and journalist.

== Life and career ==
Bradley graduated from Yale University in 1986, and began working at The New Republic in Washington, D.C., followed by Regardie's magazine. He then earned a master's degree in American history from Harvard University. Bradley returned to Regardie's in 1992 as editor-in-chief and became one of the original editors of George magazine in 1995. He was the executive editor of "George" at the time of John F. Kennedy Jr.'s death in a plane crash on July 16, 1999.

His first book, American Son, about John F. Kennedy Jr. and George magazine, was a nonfiction bestseller, reaching #1 on the nonfiction New York Times Bestseller List. GQ magazine remarked that the book "oozed necrophilia"; David Carr wrote in The New York Times that “'Richard Blow' became a synonym for New York publishing ambition, the very portrait of a man who saw his chance and took it. Some critics claimed that Mr. Bradley fired two George writers, Lisa DePaulo and Douglas Brinkley, for speaking to the press about their infinitely famous boss after Mr. Kennedy's death in 1999 and then turned around to write his own account.” Blow responded that while he had requested staff members not to speak to the press, it was at the apparent request of John's sister, Caroline Kennedy, and that no one had been fired from George for speaking to the press. "With the appropriate passage of time many former George staffers have spoken to the media and written about our former boss," Blow wrote.

He changed his surname from Blow to Bradley (his mother's maiden name) prior to releasing his second book in 2005, Harvard Rules, about Harvard president Lawrence Summers. The book, according to Publishers Weekly, "offers an insightful look at how the role of the American university president has changed from a moral and intellectual leader independent of political and corporate power to the administrator of an institution largely dependent on corporate and government largesse for its continued existence." His 2008 book The Greatest Game is about the one-game playoff between the New York Yankees and Boston Red Sox on October 2, 1978.

In 2008, Bradley was named editor-in-chief for the 2009 re-launch of Worth magazine , a position he held until 2019.

In November 2014, recalling his prior involvement with noted fabricator Stephen Glass while at George, Bradley was one of the first serious journalists to question the gang-rape story related in the December 2014 Rolling Stone article "A Rape on Campus."

== Bibliography ==
- American Son: A Portrait of John F. Kennedy Jr. (2002) (as Richard Blow)
- Harvard Rules: The Struggle for the Soul of the World’s Most Powerful University (2005)
- The Greatest Game: The Yankees, the Red Sox, and the Playoff of '78 (2008)ISBN 9781416534389
