= Teresa Carpenter =

American author

- Born: 1948 (age 77–78); Independence, Missouri, U.S.
- Education: Graceland University (B.A.), University of Missouri (M.A.)
- Occupations: Author, columnist
- Spouse: Steven Levy
- Writing career
- Genres: Non-fiction, true crime
- Notable awards: Pulitzer Prize for Feature Writing (1981)
- Website: www.teresacarpenter.com

Teresa Carpenter (born 1948) is an American author. Her awards include the Pulitzer Prize for best feature writing.

== Biography ==
Teresa Carpenter was born in Independence, Missouri. She lives with her husband Steven Levy in New York's Greenwich Village.

She is the author of four books: Without a Doubt (1997) (with Marcia Clark), a New York Times #1 bestseller, Missing Beauty (1988), a New York Times bestseller, and The Miss Stone Affair (2003). She is also the editor of New York Diaries 1609–2009.

Arlyne Brickman, the Mafia informant and mob moll, was the subject of Carpenter's non-fiction book Mob Girl: A Woman's Life in the Underworld (1992) published by Simon & Schuster.

Carpenter's articles have appeared in several anthologies:

- Pulitzer Prize Feature Stories, edited by David Garlock
- Profiles in Courage for our Time, edited by Caroline Kennedy
- The Village Voice Anthology, edited by Geoffrey Stokes
- Feature Writing for Newspapers and Magazines, edited by Edward Jay Friedlander and John Lee
- Excellence in Reporting, edited by Edward Jay Friedlander, Harry Marsh and Mike Masterson.

== Awards ==
Her articles in the Village Voice in the 1980s won the Pulitzer Prize for best feature writing, as well as two Clarion awards, the Page One Award, and the Front Page award. Carpenter was awarded the 1981 Pulitzer in Feature Writing for her account of model Dorothy Stratten's death, after it was revealed that the original winning article, "Jimmy's World", by Janet Cooke of The Washington Post, was a fabrication.
