= Brian Kelly (editor) =

American journalist & author (born 1954)

Editor of U.S. News & World Report
- Incumbent
- Assumed office April 2007
- Preceded by: Brian Duffy

Personal details
- Born: Brian Kelly; September 13, 1954 (age 72) Passaic, New Jersey
- Education: Georgetown University
- Occupation: Magazine editor, journalist, author

Brian Kelly (born September 13, 1954, in Passaic, New Jersey) is an American journalist and author. Kelly is currently the editor and chief content officer of U.S. News & World Report, a position he has held since 2007.

== Early life ==
Brian Kelly grew up in Clifton, New Jersey, and soon thereafter moved to Fair Haven, New Jersey, at the age of 13. He attended Rumson-Fair Haven Regional High School where he was the editor of both the literary magazine and school paper, The Rumsonian, before graduating in 1972. Kelly was inducted into the school's Hall of Fame in 2005. Kelly attended Georgetown University, where he rose to become the editor in chief of The Georgetown Voice. He graduated with a bachelor's degree in economics in 1976.

== Career ==
Kelly began his journalism career in 1976 at the Red Bank Register, under Art Kamin. From there he took a job in Chicago at the Chicago-Sun Times as an assistant business editor, and lead reporter, he covered politics and economics. In 1985, Kelly moved to Washington, D.C., to take the helm as the editor of Regardie's magazine until 1992. In 1992, Kelly joined The Washington Post as a senior editor. Over his time at the Post he spent time as deputy editor for the Style section and "Outlook", The Washington Post's Sunday opinion section. Kelly moved up the corporate ladder quickly at The Washington Post to congressional editor where he managed coverage of the U.S. House of Representatives and U.S. Senate and within a short time moved up to national editor where he helped keep The Washington Post's political and national news coverage at top notch quality.

Kelly joined U.S. News & World Report in 1998 as assistant managing editor where he played a key role in the weekly publishing of the magazine as well as overseeing the company's website USNews.com and their signature annual college rankings, America's Best Colleges. Today Kelly has expanded these rankings in many other areas including Best High Schools, Best Hospitals, and Best Health Plans. Kelly also made the decision in 2009 to cease regular print publication in favor of a digital publishing model. This strategy helped engineer the turn around of the company.

== Publications ==
External videos
- Booknotes interview with Kelly on Adventures in Porkland, December 13, 1992, C-SPAN

Kelly is the author of four books including Amazon, a look into the drastically changing rainforest, co written with Mark London in 1985. Kelly also coauthored The Four Little Dragons a look into the four rising economies of Asia in the late 1980s' published in 1990. Kelly's most recent works include Adventures in Porkland, an analysis of the abuse of the 1990 congressional budget published in 1992, and The Last Forest: The Amazon in the age of globalization in 2007. The Last Forest, co-authored with London, was a follow-up to Amazon, twenty-two years after their original trip.

== Personal life ==
Brian Kelly lives in Washington, D.C., with his wife, journalist Pat Wingert. They have three children. They met while both working at the Chicago Sun-Times in Chicago, Illinois.

Kelly has been a member of The Economic Club of Washington, D.C., since January 2014; he was elected a vice president in 2015. He serves on the board of the Children's Inn at the National Institutes of Health. In 2013, Kelly joined the Cosmos Club.
