= David Hunke =

Former chairman of USA Today

David L. Hunke
- Born: c. 1952
- Education: University of Kansas (BS)

David L. Hunke was the chairman of USA Today. He served as the company's publisher from April 2009 until 2012. Hunke's tenure at USA Today involved overseeing the transition of the paper to its full digital model.

Hunke's career in journalism began in 1974, where he conducted advertising sales at The Kansas City Star. He subsequently worked as the advertising director of The Miami Herald. Hunke's later career spanned Gannett publications. He was the vice president of advertising for the Cincinnati Enquirer from 1992 to 1999. He served as president and publisher of the Rochester, New York Democrat and Chronicle from 1999 to 2005 and became CEO of the Detroit Media Partnership and publisher of the Detroit Free Press in 2005.

Following his work at USA Today, Hunke served on the board of the Potomac Riverkeeper Network, as an advisor at The Postrider, and as chief strategy advisor and board member at Digerati.

Hunke lives in Arlington County, Virginia.
