= Journalistic scandal =

Publicized controversy about journalistic actions

Journalism scandals are high-profile incidents or acts, whether intentional or accidental, that run contrary to the generally accepted ethics and standards of journalism, or otherwise violate the 'ideal' mission of journalism: to report news events and issues accurately and fairly.

As the investigative and reporting face of the media, journalists are usually required to follow various journalistic standards. These may be written and codified, or customary expectations. Typical standards include references to honesty, avoiding journalistic bias, demonstrating responsibility, striking an appropriate balance between privacy and public interest, shunning financial or romantic conflict of interest, and choosing ethical means to obtain information. Penalties may vary, but have been known to include re-assignment to other jobs in the same company.

Journalistic scandals are public scandals arising from incidents where in the eyes of some party, these standards were significantly breached. In most journalistic scandals, deliberate or accidental acts take place that run contrary to the generally accepted ethics and standards of journalism, or otherwise violate the 'ideal' mission of journalism: to report news events and issues accurately and fairly.

== Common characteristics ==
Journalistic scandals include: plagiarism, fabrication, and omission of information; activities that violate the law, or violate ethical rules; the altering or staging of an event being documented; or making substantial reporting or researching errors with the results leading to libelous or defamatory statements.

All journalistic scandals have the common factor that they call into question the integrity and truthfulness of journalism. These scandals shift public focus and scrutiny onto the media itself. Because credibility is journalism's main currency, many news agencies and mass media outlets have strict codes of conduct and enforce them, and use several layers of editorial oversight to catch problems before stories are distributed.

However, in some cases, investigations later found that long-established journalistic checks and balances in the newsrooms failed. In some cases, senior editors fail to catch bias, libel, or fabrication inserted into a story by a reporter.

In other cases, the checks and balances were omitted in the rush to get an important, 'breaking' news story to press (or on air). Furthermore, in many libel and defamation cases, the publication would have had full support of editorial oversight in case of yellow journalism.

== See also ==
- Category:Journalistic scandals
- Janet Leslie Cooke
- Jayson Blair
- Sabrina Erdely
- Stephen Glass
- Johann Hari
- Molly Ball
- Claas Relotius
