= Blood Defense =

- Author: Marcia Clark
- Audio read by: Tavia Gilbert
- Language: English
- Series: Samantha Brinkman
- Genre: Legal thriller
- Publisher: Thomas & Mercer
- Publication date: May 1, 2016
- Publication place: United States
- Media type: Print (hardcover, paperback); E-book; Audiobook
- Pages: 389 (first edition)
- ISBN: 978-1-503-93619-5 (first edition, hardcover)
- Followed by: Moral Defense

Blood Defense is a 2016 legal thriller by Marcia Clark, an attorney and former prosecutor. The first of a series, the novel follows criminal defense attorney and television pundit Samantha Brinkman as she takes on a high-profile murder case. It was announced in August 2016 that the first two Brinkman novels were being adapted as a TV series for NBC, to be co-written by Clark.

== Background ==
Blood Defense draws on Clark's personal experience as a defense attorney early in her career. She later came into the public eye as the lead prosecutor in the 1995 O.J. Simpson murder trial.

From 2011 to 2014, Clark wrote a series of legal thriller novels featuring prosecutor Rachel Knight, which includes Guilt By Association, Guilt By Degrees, Killer Ambition, and The Competition. Guilt By Association was adapted into a television pilot for TNT in 2014.

While Knight is straightforward and unlikely to bend the rules, Clark called Blood Defense's lead character Samantha Brinkman "more morally ambiguous". Clark said that she developed Rachel Knight from a desire to write a realistic take on a prosecutor and her friends, with women supporting each other at a time when the opposite was being celebrated with The Real Housewives. By contrast, Samantha Brinkman reflects her interest in "noir and a darker character".

She said:

I also wanted to write a character who was a lot more twisted than Rachel Knight ... She really doesn't believe that the law is anything but a suggestion, which she chooses to not follow most of the time. It's a really fun character to write because she is so far out there, but she's a great lawyer—she has the loyalties she has, she has the personal issues that she has.

Clark noted, "You have a lot more leeway with a defense attorney than with a prosecutor ... The prosecution has to go with the evidence and the facts and tell the story as it happened. The defense has more creative freedom. All you have to do is look for a defense that works. But it doesn't have to be the truth." She also said of Samantha, "The fact that she is a defense attorney creates a lot of new possibilities for me as a writer. She's also sort of reckless and daring and she pushes things far, in terms of the lengths that she will go to to get things done."

Clark said, "I particularly wanted to show what a defense attorney's job is in this age of social media, as well as the ability of a lawyer to access public opinion through Twitter and Facebook. I wanted to use all of today's tools to show what it's like to be a defense attorney in this world."

== Plot ==
Samantha Brinkman, a criminal defense attorney with few clients but a good reputation in the Los Angeles courts, lands the high-profile double murder case of Detective Dale Pearson. Initially attributed to a botched burglary, the murders of actress Chloe Monahan and her roommate Paige Avner are soon blamed on the veteran police officer, who had been dating Chloe and was overheard fighting with her on the night of her death. Unsure of his guilt or innocence, Samantha and her team—paralegal Michelle Fusco and hacker/investigator/felon Alex Medrano—build their defense of Pearson.

== Publication ==
Blood Defense was released on May 1, 2016 by Thomas & Mercer. While her Rachel Knight series was published by "traditional publisher" Mulholland Books, Thomas & Mercer is an imprint of Amazon Publishing.

Of the change, Clark said:

I wanted better marketing. I wanted a bigger footprint in the digital market ... this is a book for you to have fun, sit on the beach and read and take you away, or read on the airplane ... those books sell best on Kindle ... Amazon is phenomenally organized, it's a powerful machine, and they really know what they're doing.

Clark's contract is for two books a year, which she calls a "tough" pace as a writer but also "a brilliant marketing choice". She explained:

People are used to streaming and binge-watching. When they see an author they like, if there's only one book, even if they like the book, they're going to forget about you. The way to keep you in their mind and to get you to become a habit for these readers is you have to have a lot of product out there for them to read. They keep reading and coming back. A lot of readers of mystery thrillers in particular are fast readers. They shoot through that stuff quick.

== Reception ==
Calling Clark's new series "promising", Publishers Weekly wrote that "Clark sprinkles jaw-dropping surprises throughout and impressively pulls off a shocker that lesser writers can only envy." Shawna Seed of The Dallas Morning News described the "ethically flexible" Samantha as believably flawed, praising the novel's ending and Clark's portrayal of "the symbiotic relationship between the L.A. criminal justice system and the media". Jonathan Elderfield wrote for Associated Press that Clark "has the most fun when she's showing readers the world of celebrity trials, from the media circus, the courthouse crowds, the crazies and the police to the inner workings of the trial itself".

== Television adaptation ==
In April 2016, Mandeville TV approached Clark about producing Blood Defense as a legal procedural TV series, and the project was acquired by ABC Studios "in a competitive situation". Elizabeth Craft and Sarah Fain from the ABC/Mandeville production The Family were brought in to co-write the adaptation with Clark. NBC signed a put pilot commitment for the Blood Defense series in August 2016.

== Sequels ==
A sequel, Moral Defense, was released on November 8, 2016. Clark began developing it in September 2015, and the novel was already written when Blood Defense was released in May 2016. In Moral Defense, Samantha defends a 15-year-old girl accused of brutally murdering her adoptive family. Clark said that though Samantha is dealing with a new crime, "the issues that are hatched in Blood Defense are definitely going to come back to haunt her".

The third Samantha Brinkman novel, Snap Judgment, was published on August 29, 2017. The novel finds Samantha defending another attorney who may or may not be involved in the death of his murdered daughter's boyfriend.

A fourth novel, Final Judgment, was released on April 21, 2020. It follows Samantha as her boyfriend, Niko Ferrell, becomes the prime suspect in a murder.
