= U.S. News & World Report =

American media company and magazine

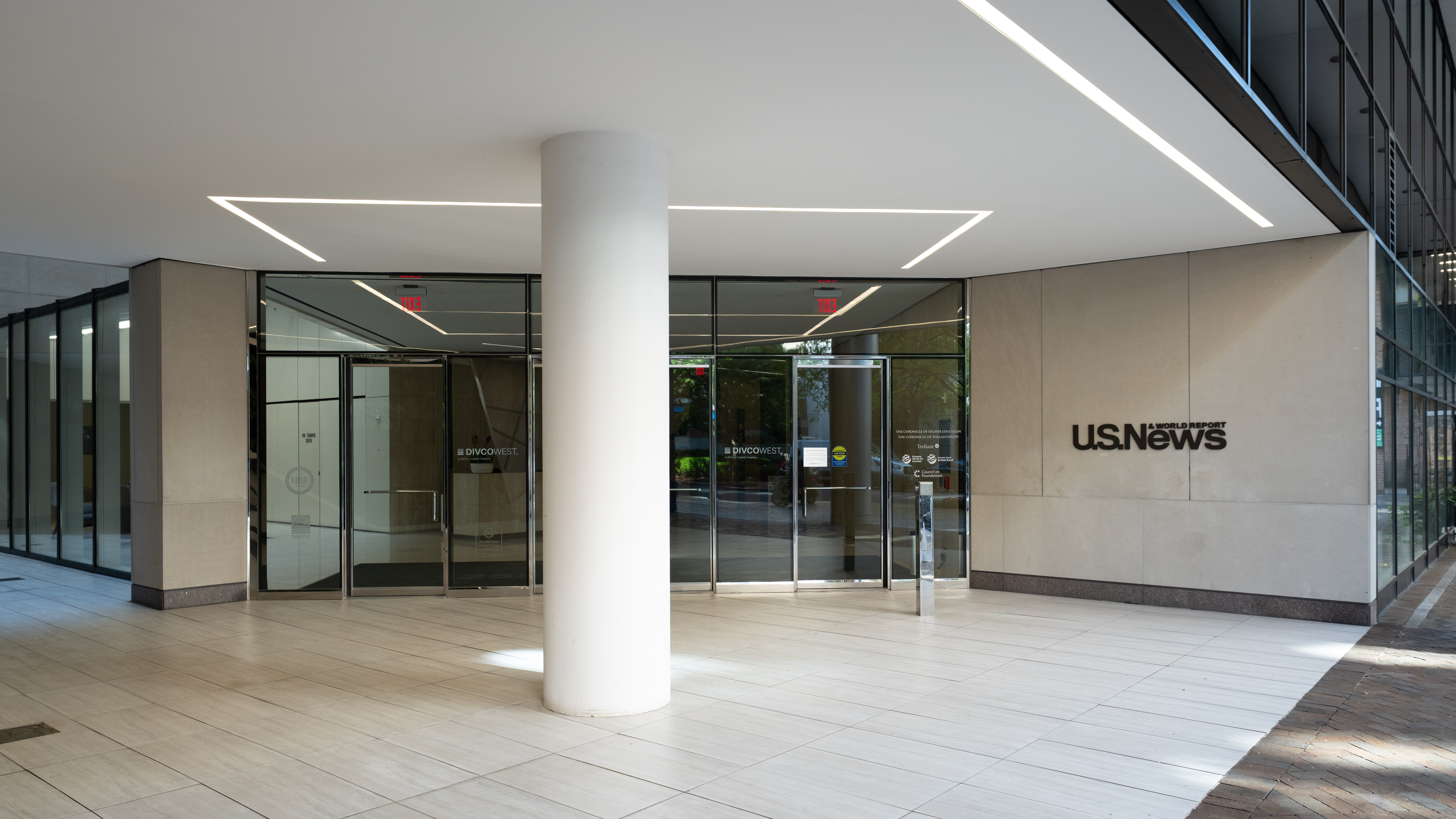
- Editorial Headquarters in Washington, D.C.
- Founded: 1948; 78 years ago (merger of United States News [1933] and World Report [1946])
- Headquarters: Washington, D.C., U.S. (editorial staff); New York City, U.S. (advertising, sales)
- Key people: Eric Gertler (CEO); Chris DiCosmo and Chad Smolinski (Co-presidents); Dafna Linzner (Editorial director)
- Products: Best Colleges Ranking
- Owner: U.S. News & World Report, L.P. (Mortimer Zuckerman)
- Website: usnews.com

U.S. News & World Report (USNWR, U.S. NEWS) is an American media company publishing news, consumer advice, rankings, and analysis. The company was launched in 1948 as the merger of domestic-focused weekly newspaper U.S. News and international-focused weekly magazine World Report.

In 1995, the company launched its website, usnews.com, and, in 2010, ceased printing its weekly news magazine, publishing only its ranking editions in print. U.S. News licences its name to the subjects it ranks, so they may then use the annual rankings in promotional literature.

== History ==
=== 20th century ===
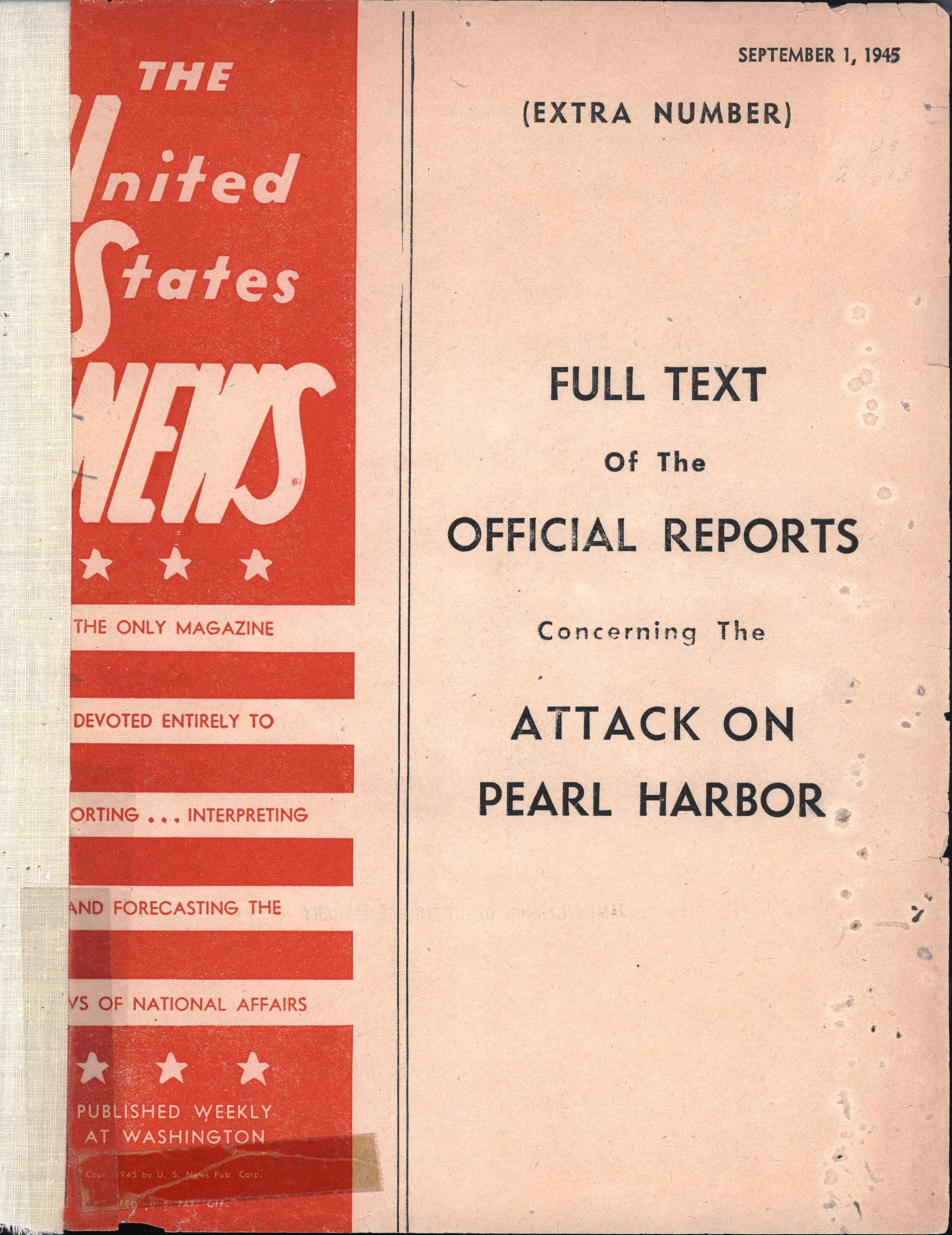
The September 1, 1945, issue of United States News reporting on the attack on Pearl Harbor on December 7, 1941

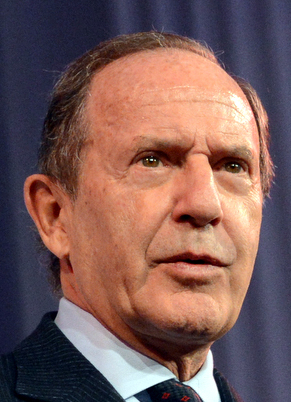
Mortimer Zuckerman, who acquired U.S. News & World Report in October 1984

After the closure of United States Daily, which was published between 1926 and 1933, David Lawrence (1888–1973) founded the newspaper United States News in 1933, which was converted to magazine format in 1940.

In 1946, Lawrence founded the magazine World Report. The two magazines covered national and international news separately. In 1948, Lawrence merged them into U.S. News & World Report. He then sold the magazine to his employees. The magazine initially tended to be slightly more conservative than its two primary competitors, Time and Newsweek, focusing more on economic, health, and education stories. It also eschewed sports, entertainment, and celebrity news.

Important milestones in the early history of the magazine include the introduction of the "Washington Whispers" column in 1934, and the "News You Can Use" column in 1952. In 1958, the weekly magazine's circulation passed one million reaching two million by 1973.

Since 1983, U.S. News & World Report has been known primarily for its influential ranking and annual reports of colleges and graduate schools, spanning across most fields and subjects. U.S. News & World Report is America's oldest and best-known ranker of academic institutions, and covers the fields of business, law, medicine, engineering, education, social sciences, and public affairs, in addition to many other areas. Its print edition consistently has been included in national bestseller lists, augmented by online subscriptions. Additional rankings published by U.S. News & World Report include hospitals, medical specialties, and automobiles.

In October 1984, New York City-based publisher and real estate developer Mortimer Zuckerman purchased U.S. News & World Report. Zuckerman had owned the New York Daily News. In 1993, U.S. News & World Report entered the digital world by providing content to CompuServe and in 1995 the website usnews.com was launched.

=== 21st century ===
In 2001, the website won a National Magazine Award for General Excellence Online. In 2007, U.S. News & World Report published its first list of the nation's best high schools. Its ranking methodology included state test scores and documented the success of poor and minority students on the exams, and schools' performance in Advanced Placement exams.

Beginning in June 2008, the magazine reduced its publication frequency in three steps. In June 2008, citing an overall decline in magazine circulation and advertising, U.S. News & World Report announced that it would become a biweekly publication, starting in January 2009. It hoped advertisers would be attracted to the schedule, which allowed ads to stay on newsstands a week longer. However, five months later the magazine changed its frequency again, becoming monthly.

In August 2008, U.S. News expanded and revamped its online opinion section. The new version of the opinion page included daily new op-ed content as well as the new Thomas Jefferson Street blog. An internal memo was sent to the magazine's staff on November 5, 2010, informing them that the "December issue will be our last print monthly sent to subscribers, whose remaining print and digital replica subscriptions will be filled by other publishers." The memo said that the publication would be moving to a primarily digital format but that special issues such as "the college and grad guides, as well as hospital and personal finance guides" would be printed.

Prior to ending physical publication in 2010, U.S. News was generally the third-ranked general United States-based news magazine after Time and Newsweek. A weekly digital magazine, U.S. News Weekly, introduced in January 2009, continued to offer subscription content until it stopped publication at the end of April 2015.

== Ownership ==
The company is owned by U.S. News & World Report, L.P., a privately held company with editorial headquarters in Washington, D.C., and its advertising, sales, and corporate offices in New York City and New Jersey. The company's move to the Web made it possible for U.S. News & World Report to expand its service journalism with the introduction of several consumer-facing rankings products.

By the early 2010s, under the leadership of Brian Kelly, the company had returned to profitability, largely through its list model, adopted in 2009, and the ease with which that transferred to online publishing.

The leadership team includes executive chairman Eric Gertler, president and chief executive officer William Holiber, chief financial officer and chief operating officer Neil Maheshwari, and Dafna Linzner, the editorial director. Brian Kelly was the chief content officer from April 2007 to August 2019 and Kim Castro was the chief content officer until 2023. The company is owned by media proprietor Mortimer Zuckerman.

== Rankings ==
=== Who Runs America? ===
The first U.S. News & World Report's rankings was its "Who Runs America?" surveys. They were published in the spring annually from 1974 to 1986. The magazine cover for each release featured persons selected by the USN & WR as being the ten most powerful persons in the United States. Each edition of the series listed the president of the United States as the most powerful person, but the #2 position included people like Secretary of State Henry Kissinger (1974), Federal Reserve Chairmen Paul Volcker and Arthur Burns (each listed multiple years), and U.S. Senator Edward Kennedy (1979). Most of the top ten each year were government officials; occasionally others were included like TV anchormen Walter Cronkite and Dan Rather, Chase Manhattan Bank Chairman David Rockefeller, AFL–CIO leader George Meany, and consumer advocate Ralph Nader. The only woman to make the top ten list was First Lady Rosalynn Carter in 1980.

In addition to these overall top ten persons, the publication also included top persons in each of several fields, including education, business, finance, journalism, and other areas. The survey was discontinued after its 1986 edition.

=== Best Colleges ===
The top ten "national universities" (red) and "liberal arts colleges" (blue) in the U.S. News & World Report Best Colleges Ranking, as of 2022

U.S. News & World Report Best Colleges Ranking is an annual set of rankings of colleges and universities in the United States, which was first published by U.S. News & World Report in 1983. It has been described as the most influential institutional ranking in the country.

The Best Colleges rankings have raised controversy, and they have been denounced by several education experts. Detractors argue that they rely on self-reported, sometimes fraudulent data by the institutions, encourage gamesmanship by institutions looking to improve their rank, imply a false precision by deriving an ordinal ranking from questionable data, contribute to the admissions frenzy by unduly highlighting prestige, and ignore individual fit by comparing institutions with widely diverging missions on the same scale.

=== Best Global Universities ===
In October 2014, U.S. News & World Report published its inaugural "Best Global Universities" rankings. Inside Higher Ed noted that U.S. News was entering into the international college and university rankings area which was "dominated by three major global university rankings", namely the Times Higher Education World University Rankings, the Academic Ranking of World Universities, and the QS World University Rankings. Robert Morse, "U.S. News's chief data strategist," said that "it's natural for U.S. News to get into this space". He said that U.S. News "will also be the first American publisher to enter the global rankings space".

=== Best Hospitals ===
Since 1990, U.S. News & World Report has compiled Best Hospitals rankings. The rankings are specifically based on a different methodology which looks at difficult (high acuity) cases within 16 specialties including cancer; diabetes and endocrinology; ear, nose, and throat; gastroenterology, geriatrics, gynecology; heart and heart surgery; kidney disorders; neurology and neurosurgery; ophthalmology, orthopedics, psychiatry, pulmonology, rehabilitation, rheumatology, and urology. In addition to rankings for each of these specialties, hospitals that excel in many U.S. News areas are ranked in the Honor Roll.

=== Best Cars ===
Since 2007, U.S. News has ranked new and used automobiles. The rankings span over 30 classes of cars, trucks, SUVs, minivans, wagons, and sports cars. Each automobile receives an overall score and a performance, interior, and recommendation score. Scores are based on the critics selected by U.S. News, as well as reliability and safety data. U.S. News also produces annual "Best Cars for the Money" and "Best Cars for Families" awards across approximately 20 classes of cars, trucks, SUVs, and minivans. Money award winners are derived by combining vehicle price and five-year cost of ownership with the opinion of the automotive press, while family awards are tabulated by combining critics' opinions with the vehicle's availability of family-friendly features and interior space, as well as safety and reliability data. Money and family award winners are announced in February and March of each year, respectively.

=== Best States ===
Education ranking of state residents as of 2019: 01–10, 11–20, 21–30, 31–40, 41–50

In 2017, U.S. News published its first ranking of all 50 U.S. states, incorporating metrics in seven categories: health care, education, crime and corrections, infrastructure, opportunity, economy, and government. The weighting of the individual categories in determining overall rank was informed by surveys on what matters most to residents. Massachusetts occupied the top rank, and Louisiana ranked worst.

In 2018, the eight categories were: health care, education, economy, opportunity, infrastructure, crime and corrections, fiscal stability, and quality of life. Iowa was ranked first, and Louisiana ranked worst. In 2019, natural environment replaced the quality of life category. Washington occupied the top rank, and Louisiana ranked worst.

No ranking was published in 2020. In 2021, Washington, Minnesota, and Utah topped the list; New Mexico, Mississippi, and Louisiana were ranked as the worst.
