= Sabrina Erdely =

American journalist

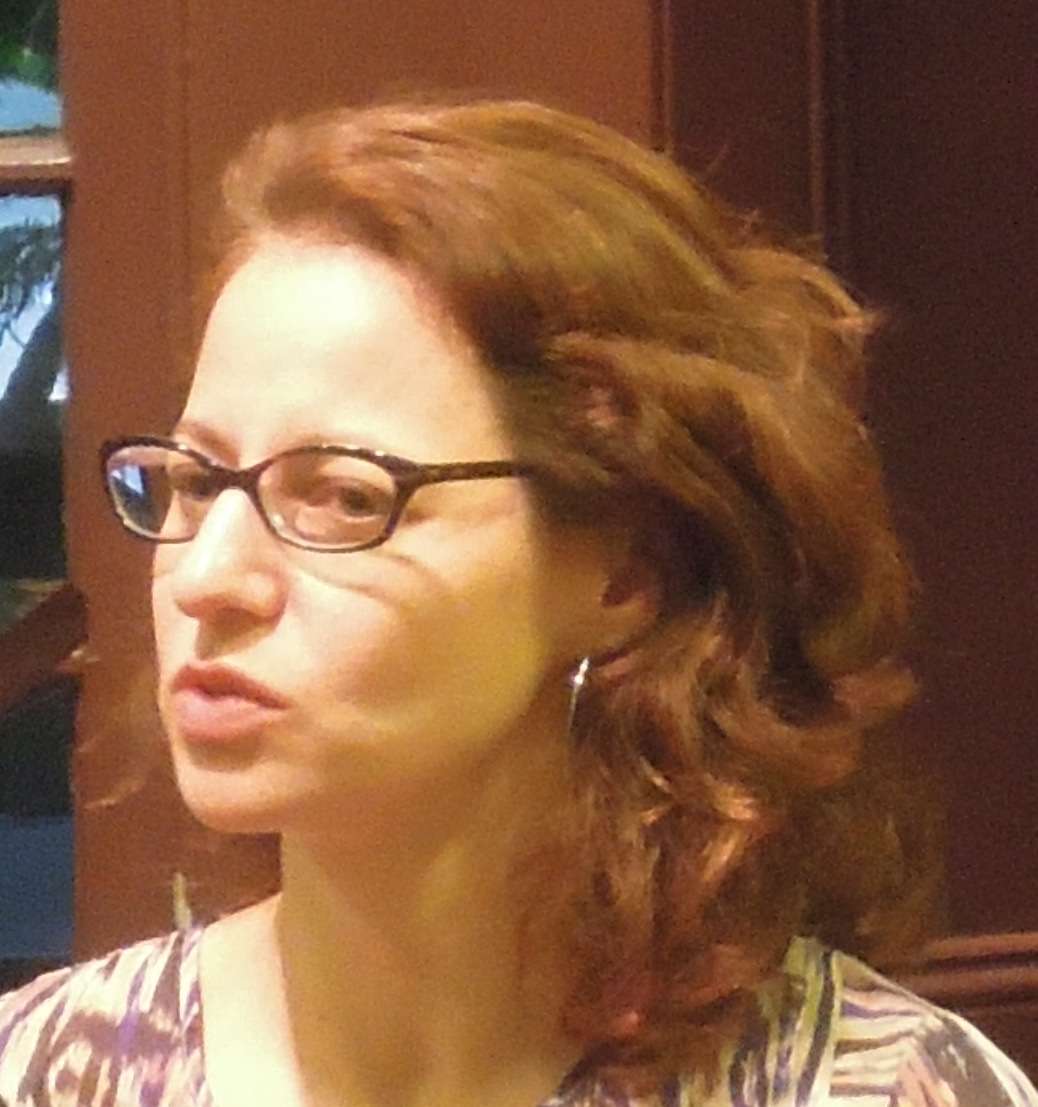
- Erdely in 2012
- Born: Sabrina Rubin; 1971 or 1972 (age 53–54); New York, U.S.
- Education: University of Pennsylvania
- Occupations: Reporter, writer
- Known for: Author of defamatory Rolling Stone story, "A Rape on Campus"
- Spouse: Peter Erdely
- Children: 2
- Awards: GLAAD Media Award (2012)
- Website: sabrinaerdely.com

Sabrina Rubin Erdely is an American former journalist and magazine reporter, who in 2014 authored a defamatory article in Rolling Stone describing the alleged rape of a University of Virginia student by several fraternity members. The story, titled "A Rape on Campus", was later discredited. The magazine retracted the article following a Columbia University School of Journalism review which concluded that Erdely and Rolling Stone failed to engage in "basic, even routine journalistic practice". As a result, Erdely was named in three lawsuits with demands of more than $32 million combined for damages resulting from the publication of the story.

A graduate of the University of Pennsylvania, Erdely has written about rape and bullying. Prior to the Rolling Stone article, her work appeared in GQ, Self, The New Yorker, Mother Jones, Glamour, Men's Health and Philadelphia.

In November 2016, a federal court jury found Erdely was liable for defamation with actual malice in a lawsuit brought by University of Virginia administrator Nicole Eramo, and Erdely was found personally responsible for $3 million in damages.

== Education and early life ==
Erdely was born in New York. She graduated from the University of Pennsylvania in 1994. According to Erdely, she was initially a pre-med student but became an English major while working on the staff of 34th Street, the magazine insert for the Daily Pennsylvanian, the campus newspaper. During her tenure at 34th Street, her colleague Stephen Glass "threw a righteous fit" after she and another colleague "concocted a funny and obviously made-up travel story" for the magazine. Later, in an article she wrote for the University of Pennsylvania alumni magazine, she called Glass a "sociopathic creep" because, she said, he fabricated stories published as factual journalism in The New Republic.

== Career ==
=== Early career ===
After leaving Penn, Erdely went to work for Philadelphia before pursuing a career as a freelance magazine writer.

=== Magazine writing ===
Erdely's 1996 story for Philadelphia, concerning a woman who alleged she had been raped by her gynecologist, was nominated for a National Magazine Award. A 2012 story for Rolling Stone, alleging bullying of gay students in Minnesota, was nominated for and received a GLAAD Media Award for Outstanding Magazine Article.

==== Rolling Stone article: "The Catholic Church's Secret Sex-Crime Files" ====
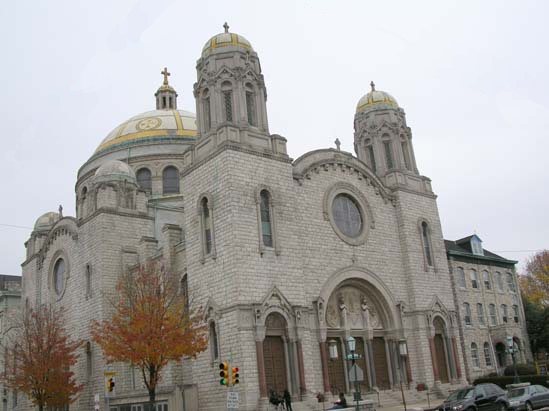
Erdely's 2011 story on Philadelphia's Catholic church, which alleged Charles Engelhardt, a priest at St Francis de Sales (pictured) sexually abused a minor, has been criticized for over-reliance on a dubious source.

In 2011, Erdely reported a story for Rolling Stone about child abuse within the Roman Catholic Church in Philadelphia; the church had been under investigation in numerous cities since The Boston Globe's exposé in 2002 of church protection of predatory priests. Erdely's article described a fifth grade altar boy referred to by the pseudonym "Billy Doe" whom "brutal attacks turned ... into a sullen, drug-addicted loner," alleging a "high-level conspiracy". Billy Doe was an adult when he made his accusations, resulting in criminal charges leading to the jailing of three church employees. Doe also filed a major civil suit against the church.

Ralph Cipriano wrote in Newsweek that "Erdely didn't know or bother to find out ... that Billy had already told his story to the archdiocese, police, and a grand jury, and would subsequently retell it to two different juries in two criminal cases. And every time he told his story, the details kept changing." In the first iteration of the rape Billy Doe claimed to have endured, he was knocked unconscious, stripped, tied to a church altar with sashes, and anally raped on the altar for five hours. Subsequent iterations of the rape recounted by Doe were less dramatic; a final version omitted the five-hour altar anal rape. Instead, Billy Doe explained, he had been coerced into engaging in mutual masturbation. Cipriano criticized Erdely for failing to include information on Billy Doe's background that could have impugned his credibility; he had, for instance, been arrested six times, once while trafficking 56 bags of heroin. Doe's lawyer Slade McLaughlin, and David Clohessy, head of SNAP, have noted in response that substance abuse is a common reaction to childhood sexual abuse.

When Erdely was covering the Billy Doe story, her husband was a criminal prosecutor for the District Attorney of Philadelphia, which was overseeing the case. Rolling Stone editors said that it was not a conflict of interest because he was not personally involved in the prosecution. William Anthony Donohue at the Catholic League denounced "malicious distortions of the kind found in Erdely's diatribe".

The conviction of one church employee, Msgr. William J. Lynn, has been overturned in 2013 due to the 1972 statute on child endangerment not applying to supervisors, and a new trial ordered for the one remaining (Rev. Charles Engelhardt, the third church employee, died in prison while appealing his conviction). In 2017 schoolteacher Bernard Shero saw his conviction quashed and pleaded no contest.

==== Rolling Stone article: "A Rape on Campus" ====
Erdely's article for Rolling Stone, titled "A Rape on Campus", was published in the December 2014 issue of that magazine. It falsely alleged that seven members of Phi Kappa Psi at the University of Virginia gang-raped a student at that fraternity house on September 28, 2012.

Separate inquiries by both Phi Kappa Psi and The Washington Post revealed major errors and discrepancies in the report. Erdely's story was subject to intense media criticism and questions as to its truthfulness. The Washington Post and Boston Herald both issued calls for magazine staff involved in the report to be fired. Natasha Vargas-Cooper, a columnist at The Intercept, said that Erdely's story showed "a horrendous, hidden bias," while an editorial in The Wall Street Journal charged that "Ms. Erdely did not construct a story based on facts, but went looking for facts to fit her theory." As criticism of the story mounted, Erdely disappeared from public view, with various media outlets describing her as "MIA" and "off the grid". Rolling Stone subsequently issued three apologies for the story. On December 10, 2014, The Washington Post published an updated account of its inquiry into the Rolling Stone article. Summarizing that report, Slate noted that it "strongly implies, without outright saying so, that the gang rape at the center of Sabrina Rubin Erdely's article might be fabricated".

Scott Goodman, a lawyer, speculated that legal action against the magazine by persons accused of the rape may result. Rolling Stone publisher Jann S. Wenner asked the dean of the Columbia University Graduate School of Journalism to audit the editorial processes leading up to the publication of the controversial story.

On January 12, 2015, the University of Virginia reinstated the Phi Kappa Psi fraternity after the police investigation concluded that no incident had occurred at the fraternity. According to Charlottesville police captain Gary Pleasants, Charlottesville police "found no basis to believe that an incident occurred at that fraternity, so there's no reason to keep them suspended". The police investigation into the allegations made by Erdely was concluded (though not closed) on March 23, 2015; no evidence was found to support Erdely's claims, with Charlottesville police stating that they had "no basis to conclude that anything happened in [the] fraternity house, or any fraternity house, for that matter" and that there "is no substantive basis to support the account alleged in the Rolling Stone article".

On April 5, 2015, Rolling Stone retracted the article. Erdely publicly apologized for the article on April 5, 2015, though her apology did not include any mention of the fraternity, or the members of the fraternity who were accused. The Columbia Journalism Review called the apology "a grudging act of contrition".

Both a spokesman for publisher Wenner and Will Dana, managing editor, said that Erdely would continue to write articles for Rolling Stone.

On May 12, 2015, the associate dean of students at the University of Virginia, Nicole Eramo, who oversaw sexual violence cases at the time of the article's publication, filed a lawsuit against both Rolling Stone and Erdely, seeking $7.5 million in damages based upon her claim that the article contained "highly defamatory and false statements", which she alleged, led to the destruction of Eramo's credibility, permanently damaging her reputation, and causing her emotional distress.

Beginning on October 17, 2016, a 10-member federal court jury heard testimony from 12 witnesses and saw 11 hours of video statements and more than 180 exhibits of evidence over 16 days during the trial for defamation brought by Eramo. On November 4, 2016, the jury concluded that Erdely was responsible for defamation with actual malice. The jury's finding means that it concluded Erdely knew statements about Eramo in the article were false—or had reason to doubt them and failed to investigate further—but published them anyway. The case was settled out of court.

On July 29, 2015, a separate lawsuit was filed by three members of the Phi Kappa Psi fraternity against Rolling Stone, Wenner Media, and Erdely for defamation and infliction of emotional distress caused by Erdely's story. This lawsuit was subsequently dismissed by a federal judge on June 29, 2016, because the three plaintiffs were neither explicitly nor implicitly identified in the original article. On September 19, 2017, that decision was reversed by a three judge panel of the United States Court of Appeal for the Second Circuit which found that "Plaintiffs Elias and Fowler have plausibly alleged that the purportedly defamatory statements in the Article only were 'of and concerning' them individually. We also hold that Plaintiffs have plausibly alleged that the Article was 'of and concerning' them under a theory of small group defamation." The case was settled out of court.

Erdely's Rolling Stone story "A Rape on Campus" was named by Columbia Journalism Review as "the Worst Journalism of 2014" and as "Error of the Year" by the Poynter Institute.

=== Later career ===
As of 2021, Erdely wrote for the Jewish Federation of Greater Philadelphia and co-hosted the Jewish Philly podcast. She previously taught writing courses at Temple University and the University of Pennsylvania. She also served as director of content for CTRL+M Health, a headache app.

== Film projects ==
In 2013 a film, titled The Girl Who Conned the Ivy League and based on Erdely's story of the same name for Rolling Stone, published in early 2010, was in development with Rob Epstein as director. The idea for the film had been pitched in March 2010 by screenwriter Lorene Scafaria, with Amanda Seyfried proposed for the title role of Esther Reed. However, in January 2014, an LA Weekly cover story described cocaine-dealing allegations and prison time done by Remington Chase and Stepan Martirosyan, who were involved in financing the film.

In 2013, it was announced that Craig Brewer would adapt Erdely's story "Gangster Princess of Beverly Hills" into a motion picture.

== Personal life ==
Erdely lives in Philadelphia with her husband (an attorney) and two children, a daughter and a son. She is Jewish and a member of Temple Beth Zion-Beth Israel.

== In popular culture ==
Erdely's defamatory "A Rape on Campus" article and its aftermath was the inspiration for a season 16 episode of Law & Order: Special Victims Unit. Episode 18 of the show, titled "Devastating Story", was broadcast in April 2015 and features the case of a college student who falsely claims to have been gang raped in a fraternity house.

In May 2022, an off-Broadway play adapted from Erdely's "A Rape on Campus" article controversy and resulting legal battles titled Retraction premiered in New York City at Theatre Row. In January 2026, Retraction opened off-Broadway at the Sheen Center.

== See also ==
- Jayson Blair
- Janet Cooke, author of fabricated Pulitzer Prize winning article
- Fake news
