= Stephen Glass =

American former journalist and paralegal (born 1972)

Stephen Randall Glass
- Born: Stephen Randall Glass; September 15, 1972 (age 54); Highland Park, Illinois, U.S.
- Education: University of Pennsylvania (BA); Georgetown University (JD)
- Occupations: Paralegal, writer
- Years active: 1995–1998 (as journalist)
- Spouse: Julie Hilden (m. 2014; died 2018)

Stephen Randall Glass (born September 15, 1972) is an American former journalist. He worked for The New Republic from 1995 to 1998 until an internal investigation by the magazine determined the majority of stories he wrote were either partially or entirely fabricated.

Following the journalism scandal, Glass pursued a career in law. Although he earned a Juris Doctor from Georgetown University Law Center and passed the bar in New York and California, he was unable to become a licensed attorney in either state due to concerns stemming from his scandal. Glass instead found work as a paralegal at the law firm of Carpenter, Zuckerman & Rowley, serving as the director of special projects and trial team coordinator.

Glass made a brief return to writing when he fictionalized his story in his 2003 novel The Fabulist. The same year, the scandal was dramatized in the film Shattered Glass, based on a Vanity Fair article of the same name, which stars Hayden Christensen as Glass.

== Early life and journalism career ==
Glass grew up in a Jewish family in the Chicago suburb of Highland Park, and attended Highland Park High School. He graduated from the University of Pennsylvania as a University Scholar and was an executive editor of the student newspaper, The Daily Pennsylvanian. After his graduation, Glass worked for the conservative Policy Review before being hired by The New Republic in 1995 as an editorial assistant. Soon after, the 23-year-old Glass advanced to writing features. While employed full-time at TNR, he also wrote for other magazines, including George, Rolling Stone, and Harper's; and contributed to Public Radio International's (PRI) This American Life.

=== New Republic work ===
Glass generally enjoyed loyalty from the staff of The New Republic. But his articles often relied on unnamed or partially identified sources, and several of his pieces prompted denials from their subjects.

In December 1996, the Center for Science in the Public Interest (CSPI) was the target of a hostile article by Glass titled "Hazardous to Your Mental Health". CSPI wrote a letter to the editor and issued a press release pointing out numerous inaccuracies and distortions and hinting at possible plagiarism. The organization Drug Abuse Resistance Education (D.A.R.E.) accused Glass of falsehoods in his March 1997 article, "Don't You D.A.R.E." In May 1997, Joe Galli of the College Republican National Committee accused Glass of fabrications in "Spring Breakdown", his lurid tale of drinking and debauchery at the 1997 Conservative Political Action Conference. A June 1997 article, titled "Peddling Poppy", about a Hofstra University conference on George H. W. Bush drew a letter from Hofstra reciting errors in the story.

Through these allegations, The New Republic generally defended Glass; editor Michael Kelly even demanded that CSPI apologize to Glass. Still, the magazine's majority owner and editor-in-chief, Martin Peretz, later stated that his wife had informed him that she did not find Glass's stories credible and had stopped reading them. Journalist Jonathan V. Last criticised the length of time taken to discover Glass' falsifications.

==== Exposure ====
In the May 18, 1998, issue, The New Republic published a story by Glass (by then an associate editor) titled "Hack Heaven", purportedly telling the story of a 15-year-old hacker who had penetrated a company's computer network, then been hired by that company as a security consultant. The article opened as follows,

Ian Restil, a 15-year-old computer hacker who looks like an even more adolescent version of Bill Gates, is throwing a tantrum. "I want more money. I want a Miata. I want a trip to Disney World. I want X-Men comic [book] number one. I want a lifetime subscription to Playboy – and throw in Penthouse. Show me the money! Show me the money! ..." Across the table, executives from a California software firm called Jukt Micronics are listening and trying ever so delicately to oblige. "Excuse me, sir," one of the suits says tentatively to the pimply teenager. "Excuse me. Pardon me for interrupting you, sir. We can arrange more money for you."

The issue was distributed a few days before its May 18 cover date. Adam Penenberg, a reporter with Forbes magazine, endeavored to fact-check the piece, in part to explain how Forbes Digital had been "scooped by a weekly political publication". Beyond Glass's story, Penenberg found no search results for "Jukt Micronics", and, when he made an inquiry to the California Franchise Tax Board, the tax board reported back that no such company had ever paid taxes. Penenberg also found that several other claims Glass made in the article appeared to be false. Glass claimed that law enforcement officials in Nevada ran articles pleading with companies not to hire hackers. Still, Bob Harmon, Public Information Officer for the Nevada State Attorney General's Office, stated that no such ads were run. Glass claimed that 21 states were considering a "Uniform Computer Security Act", which would "criminalize immunity deals between hackers and companies". Still, law enforcement officials and the National Conference of Commissions on Uniform State Laws were unaware of any such proposed legislation. Glass claimed that there had been a computer-hacker conference in Bethesda, Maryland, sponsored by the "National Assembly of Hackers", but the Forbes team "could not unearth a single hacker who had even heard of this outfit, let alone attended the conference".

On May 8, 1998, Forbes presented its full findings to Charles Lane, the lead editor of The New Republic. Forbes then published two stories by Penenberg regarding his findings, "Lies, damn lies and fiction" and "Forbes smokes out fake New Republic story on hackers". The latter story points out that Lane, as of the May 8 meeting with Forbes, had been unaware of potential issues with the article. After the meeting, Lane had Glass take him to a Hyatt Regency Hotel in Bethesda, Maryland, where Glass had claimed the computer-hacker convention occurred. He found that the hotel's layout did not match the story's description; the building in which the piece said the event took place had not been open on the supposed day of the conference, and the restaurant where the hackers supposedly had a dinner banquet afterward closed in the mid-afternoon. Lane dialed a Palo Alto number provided by Glass and spoke with a man who identified himself as a Jukt executive; when he realized that the "executive" was actually Glass's brother, he fired Glass.

Lane later said:

We extended normal human trust to someone who basically lacked a conscience... We busy, friendly folks, were no match for such a willful deceiver... We thought Glass was interested in our personal lives, or our struggles with work, and we thought it was because he cared. Actually, it was all about sizing us up and searching for vulnerabilities. What we saw as concern was actually contempt.

==== Aftermath ====
The New Republic subsequently determined that at least 27 of the 41 articles Glass wrote for the magazine contained fabricated material. Some of the 27, such as "Don't You D.A.R.E.", contained real reporting interwoven with fabricated quotations and incidents, while others, including "Hack Heaven", were completely made up. In the process of creating the "Hack Heaven" article, Glass had gone to especially elaborate lengths to thwart the discovery of his deception by TNR's fact checkers: creating a website and voice mail account for Jukt Micronics; fabricating notes of story gathering; having fake business cards printed; and even composing editions of a fake computer hacker community newsletter.

As for the balance of the 41 stories, Lane, in an interview given for the 2005 DVD edition of Shattered Glass, said, "In fact, I'd bet lots of the stuff in those other 14 is fake too. ... It's not like we're vouching for those 14, that they're true. They're probably not either". Rolling Stone, George, and Harper's also re-examined his contributions. Rolling Stone and Harper's found the material to be generally accurate, yet they maintained that they had no way of verifying the information because Glass had cited anonymous sources. George discovered that at least three of the stories Glass wrote for it contained fabrications. Glass fabricated quotations in a profile piece and apologized to the article's subject, Vernon Jordan, an adviser to Bill Clinton during his presidency. A court filing for Glass's application to the California bar provided an updated count of his journalism career: 36 of his stories at The New Republic were reported to be fabricated in part or in whole, along with three articles for George, two articles for Rolling Stone, and one for Policy Review. Glass also later wrote a letter admitting that he had fabricated the article he wrote for Harper's, and the company retracted the story (the publication's first retraction in 165 years).

Glass had contributed a story to an October 1997 episode of the public radio program This American Life about an internship at George Washington's former plantation and another to a December 1997 episode about the time he spent as a telephone psychic. The program subsequently removed both segments from the Archives section of its website "because of questions about [their] truthfulness".

In 2003, Glass briefly returned to journalism, writing an article about Canadian marijuana laws for Rolling Stone. On November 7, 2003, Glass participated in a panel discussion on journalistic ethics at George Washington University, alongside the editor who had hired him at The New Republic, Andrew Sullivan, who accused Glass of being a "serial liar" who was using "contrition as a career move".

It was very painful for me. It was like being on a guided tour of the moments of my life I am most ashamed of.

— Stephen Glass, reacting to Shattered Glass

==== Depiction in other media ====
In 2003, Glass published a fictionalized account of his time at The New Republic, the "biographical novel", The Fabulist. Glass sat for an interview with the weekly news program 60 Minutes timed to coincide with the release of his book. The New Republic's literary editor, Leon Wieseltier, complained, "The creep is doing it again. Even when it comes to reckoning with his own sins, he is still incapable of nonfiction. The careerism of his repentance is repulsively consistent with the careerism of his crimes". One reviewer of The Fabulist commented, "The irony—we must have irony in a tale this tawdry—is that Mr. Glass is abundantly talented. He's funny and fluent and daring. In a parallel universe, I could imagine him becoming a perfectly respectable novelist—a prize-winner, perhaps, with a bit of luck".

A film about the scandal, Shattered Glass, was released in October 2003 and depicted a stylized view of Glass's rise and fall at The New Republic. Written and directed by Billy Ray, the film stars Hayden Christensen as Glass, Peter Sarsgaard as Charles Lane, Hank Azaria as Michael Kelly, and Steve Zahn as Adam Penenberg. The film, appearing shortly after The New York Times suffered a similar plagiarism scandal with the discovery of Jayson Blair's fabrications, occasioned critiques of journalism by nationally prominent journalists such as Frank Rich and Mark Bowden.

=== Restitution efforts ===
In 2015, Glass sent Harper's Magazine a check for $10,000 – what he was paid for the false articles – writing in the attached letter that he wanted "to make right that part of my many transgressions...I recognize that repaying Harper's will not remedy my wrongdoing, make us even, or undo what I did wrong. That said, I did not deserve the money that Harper's paid me and it should be returned". Glass has stated he has repaid $200,000 to The New Republic, Rolling Stone, Harper's, and the publisher of Policy Review.

== Legal career ==
In 2000, Glass graduated magna cum laude from Georgetown University Law Center with a Juris Doctor degree and was named a John M. Olin Fellow in law and economics. He then passed the New York State bar examination in 2000, but the Committee of Bar Examiners refused to certify him on its moral-fitness test, citing ethics concerns related to his journalistic malpractice. He later abandoned his efforts to be admitted to the bar in New York.

Glass clerked for D.C. Superior Court Judge A. Franklin Burgess Jr. and interned for district-court judge Ricardo M. Urbina. In 2004, he was hired by Carpenter & Zuckerman, a personal injury law firm in West Hollywood, California. When joining the firm, Glass was told by a senior partner that being exposed as a serial fabricator "is the best thing that ever happened to you. Now that you've fallen on your face, you can actually be a useful human being." The partner also remarked later, "brilliance that has overcome failure can be truly useful to your fellow man." Glass is not licensed to practice law. At the firm, he is listed as director of special projects.

=== Unsuccessful California Bar application ===
Glass passed the California Bar Exam in 2006 or 2007. In 2009, Glass applied to join the State Bar of California. The Committee of Bar Examiners refused to certify him, finding that he did not satisfy California's moral fitness test because of his history of journalistic deception. Insisting that he had reformed, Glass then petitioned the State Bar Court's hearing department, which found that Glass possessed the necessary "good moral character" to be admitted as an attorney.

The Committee of Bar Examiners sought review in the State Bar's Review Department and filed a Writ of Review, thereby petitioning the California Supreme Court to review the decision. On November 16, 2011, the Supreme Court granted the petition, the first time in 11 years the court had granted review in a moral character case. On January 3, 2012, Glass's attorneys filed papers with the Court arguing that his behavior had been beyond reproach for more than 13 years, and this was proof that he had reformed.

On November 6, 2013, the California Supreme Court heard arguments in Glass's case and ruled unanimously against him in an opinion issued January 27, 2014. The lengthy opinion describes the applicant's history in minute detail and rejected Glass's claim to have acted honestly since his deceptions as a journalist were revealed, instead finding "instances of dishonesty and disingenuousness persisting throughout that period". The court was particularly troubled by "hypocrisy and evasiveness in Glass's testimony at the [2010] California State Bar hearing", and further noted that he did not admit the full extent of his fabrications until the California State Bar moral character proceedings in 2007. Accordingly, Glass was denied admission to the California bar.

== Personal life ==
In 1998, Glass met lawyer Julie Hilden in connection with his legal issues. They began dating in 2000 and married in 2014 after she was diagnosed with early-onset Alzheimer's. Glass tended to her in their home in Venice, Los Angeles, and hired a housekeeper and aides to stay with her while he was at work. Hilden died in 2018.

== Publications ==
=== Confirmed fabricated articles ===
Many of the articles that Glass wrote for The New Republic are no longer available online. Below are links to some of those articles, which Glass is suspected of fabricating in part or in whole:

- "A Day on the Streets", for The Daily Pennsylvanian, June 6, 1991
- "Taxis and the Meaning of Work", August 5, 1996
- "Probable Claus", published January 6 & 13, 1997
- "Holy Trinity", published January 27, 1997
- "Don't You D.A.R.E.", published March 3, 1997
- "Writing on the Wall", published March 24, 1997
- "Slavery Chic", published July 14 & 21, 1997
- "The Young and the Feckless", published September 15, 1997

=== Novels ===
- Glass, Stephen (2003). The Fabulist. Simon & Schuster. ISBN 0-7432-2712-3.

== See also ==
- Claas Relotius
- Ruth Shalit
- Janet Cooke
- Jayson Blair
- Journalism scandals
- Schön scandal
- Fake news
