= Charles Lane (journalist) =

American journalist and editor

- Born: 1961 (age 64–65)
- Education: Harvard University (BA); Yale University (MSL)
- Occupation: Journalist
- Children: 3

Charles Lane (born 1961) is an American journalist and editor. He was the editor of The New Republic from 1997 to 1999 and the deputy opinion editor for The Washington Post from 2000 to 2024. During his tenure at The New Republic, Lane oversaw the work of Stephen Glass, a staff reporter who fabricated portions of all or some of the 41 articles he had written for the magazine, in one of the largest fabrication scandals of contemporary American journalism. After leaving the New Republic, Lane went to work for the Post, where, from 2000 to 2007, he covered the Supreme Court of the United States and issues related to the criminal justice system and judicial matters. He has since joined the newspaper's editorial page.

== Early life and education ==
Born to a Jewish family in 1961, Lane attended Bethesda-Chevy Chase High School, where he was managing editor of the school newspaper, The Tattler. He earned a Bachelor of Arts degree in social studies from Harvard University in 1983. As a Knight Fellow, he earned a Master of Studies in Law from Yale Law School in 1997. He is a member of the Council on Foreign Relations.

== Career ==
Lane is a former foreign correspondent for Newsweek and served briefly as the magazine's Berlin bureau chief. For his coverage in Newsweek of the former Yugoslavia, Lane earned a Citation of Excellence from the Overseas Press Club."

The New Republic's owner, Marty Peretz, appointed Lane as editor in 1997 after firing then-editor Michael Kelly.

In 1998 fabricated reporting by a staff writer, Stephen Glass, was discovered. Lane subsequently fired Glass. The Glass fabrications constituted "the greatest scandal in the magazine's history and marked a decade of waning influence and mounting financial losses," The New York Times would later report. Following the scandal, Peretz praised Lane for his attempts to "put the ship back on its course."

Lane resigned when he learned in 1999 that Peretz was planning to replace Lane with Peter Beinart. Lane only first found out about it from the media.

Lane became an editorial writer for The Washington Post. Later, Lane covered the Supreme Court for the Post, before then rejoining the Post's editorial board in 2007. During his second stint on the newspaper's editorial board, Lane wrote primarily about fiscal and economic policy.

Lane has also taught journalism part-time at Georgetown University in Washington, DC and at Princeton University.

In 2008 Lane published The Day Freedom Died: The Colfax Massacre, the Supreme Court, and the Betrayal of Reconstruction, about the Colfax massacre of 1873 in Louisiana of blacks by white militia, including the murder of surrendered prisoners. The book received a favorable review in the New York Times. He also authored the nonfiction book Freedom's Detective, which was published in 2017.

== Popular culture ==
The 1998 journalism scandal at The New Republic was the subject of the 2003 film Shattered Glass. Lane was portrayed by actor Peter Sarsgaard. Lane himself appears on the commentary on the DVD, alongside writer and director Billy Ray. After the film was released, Lane was interviewed by Terry Gross in an episode of Fresh Air.

In 2003, Glass published a biographical novel entitled The Fabulist about his career of journalistic fabrication. A character named "Robert Underwood" was a significant figure in the novel and interpreted as a fictionalized version of Lane. Reviewing the book for the Post, writer and critic Chris Lehmann wrote that the Underwood character "is meant to induce in-the-know readers to think poorly of Charles Lane." Glass's Lane/Underwood "is a domineering, macho control freak. Glass's idea of meting out punishment to this fictional alter ego of his former boss is to impugn his masculinity; even as his office reeks with 'the hairy-chested smell of a man rising to the occasion.'"

== Personal life ==
Lane is married to a German immigrant from the former East Berlin. They have three children.
