= Freedom's Detective =

2019 book by Charles Lane

Freedom's Detective: The Secret Service, the Ku Klux Klan and the Man Who Masterminded America's First War on Terror
- First edition
- Author: Charles Lane
- Language: English
- Subject: United States History
- Publisher: Hanover Square Press Imprint of HarperCollins
- Publication date: 9 April 2019
- Publication place: United States
- Pages: 248
- ISBN: 978-133500685-1
- Website: https://www.harpercollins.com/products/freedoms-detective-charles-lane

Freedom's Detective: The Secret Service, the Ku Klux Klan and the Man Who Masterminded America's First War on Terror is a book by Charles Lane published in 2019 by the Hanover Square Press Imprint of HarperCollins. Lane describes events in the life of Hiram C. Whitley, including his adventures before the American Civil War, his activities in New Orleans during Civil War under the direction of Gen. Benjamin Butler, and Whitley's leadership role in the early days of the United States Secret Service, including its campaign against the Ku Klux Klan.

== Reviews ==
- Amy Lewontin wrote in Booklist, "Lane’s well-researched book portrays a complex lawman with questionable ethics, who long pursued shady businesses yet made his mark fighting the Klan as it gathered strength in many Southern states and threatened to grow ever larger. This is an important, highly readable, and timely study of a key historical period, the origins of the KKK, and one man’s battle against its campaign of hatred and bloodshed."
- Aram Goudsouzian wrote in the Washington Post, "Lane is sensitive to the struggles of African Americans, but he could have fleshed out the perspectives of more black characters, which would have illustrated the true resonance of the Ku Klux Klan. Strangely, for a book stuffed with tales of racist brutality, Freedom’s Detective might underplay the terror that animated the Reconstruction South."
- Sunil Dasgupta wrote in the Washington Independent Review of Books, "There is little doubt that Whitley’s journey from teenage roustabout to leader of the Secret Service—by means of opportunism, daredevilry, quick-thinking, and bald-faced lies—is an incredible story of Yankee ingenuity and institution-building. And although Lane doesn’t explicitly draw the connection, it’s hard not to see Whitley’s legacy in the investigative apparatus the federal government has since erected. Unfortunately, it is equally easy to see how the threat of white supremacy keeps emerging from America’s original sin of racial discrimination. The parallel existence of those two realities is disheartening. By declaring Hiram Whitley’s fight against the Klan America’s first 'war on terror,' Lane is calling attention to the endurance of both legacies. That knowledge makes the fine narrative in Freedom’s Detective as sobering as it is compelling."
- Michael Schaub wrote in his review on the NPR website, "The best history books are often the most unexpected ones, stories of relatively obscure people who changed society in some way, big or small. Whitley certainly isn't a household name, and never was, but his vision of the Secret Service as a national investigative force dedicated to rooting out a variety of crimes helped make the agency what it is today. Lane proves himself to be an excellent researcher and writer, and Freedom's Detective is a captivating account of a flawed but remarkable man."
- A reviewer in Publishers Weekly wrote, "Parallels between what Lane calls the first war on terror and the current one—both featured 'military commissions, selective suspensions of habeas corpus, isolated interrogation centers, and torture against terrorists'—make clear why this lesser-known chapter in American law enforcement merits attention. American history buffs won’t want to miss this one."
- A reviewer in Kirkus Reviews wrote "A detail-laden, arduously researched chronicle that delineates an important early era of the Secret Service."
