= Martyrs' Day: Chronicle of a Small War =

1992 nonfiction book

Martyrs' Day: Chronicle of a Small War is a 1992 book about the First Gulf War in Iraq by Michael Kelly.

== Reception ==
Kelly won awards and accolades for his 1991 coverage of the First Gulf War. The United States military used a pool management system to organize reporters, control access, and gain favorable coverage, but Kelly opted out of that system in favor of independent reporting. His experience during Operation Desert Storm later served as the basis for his book Martyrs' Day: Chronicles of a Small War (1993). His reporting on the war for The New Republic had already won a National Magazine Award and the Overseas Press award.

The book received the PEN/Martha Albrand Award for First Nonfiction in 1994. Ted Koppel compared Kelly's book to journalist Michael Herr's Dispatches, saying that Kelly had captured the Gulf War in print as definitively as Herr had the Vietnam War.

The New Yorker's David Remnick said Kelly's journalistic account, describing horror during war, belonged to the same genre as George Orwell's Homage to Catalonia about the Spanish Civil War or Ernie Pyle's reporting during World War II. Hertzberg of The New Republic said "Highway to Hell", which appeared April 1, 1991, and described the Highway of Death, was "most memorable", and Vare of The Atlantic praised the same article for its "emotional impact."
