= Jack Valenti =

American political advisor and lobbyist (1921–2007)

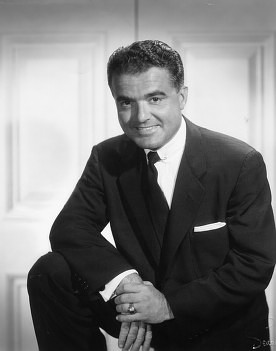

Chairman and Chief Executive Officer of the Motion Picture Association of America
- In office June 1, 1966 – September 1, 2004
- Preceded by: Eric Johnston
- Succeeded by: Dan Glickman

White House Chief of Staff
- De facto
- In office July 8, 1965 – June 1, 1966
- President: Lyndon B. Johnson
- Preceded by: Bill Moyers (de facto)
- Succeeded by: W. Marvin Watson (de facto)

White House Appointments Secretary
- In office November 22, 1963 – February 1, 1965
- President: Lyndon B. Johnson
- Preceded by: Kenneth O'Donnell
- Succeeded by: W. Marvin Watson

Personal details
- Born: Jack Joseph Valenti; September 5, 1921 Houston, Texas, U.S.
- Died: April 26, 2007 (aged 85) Washington, D.C., U.S.
- Resting place: Arlington National Cemetery
- Party: Democratic
- Spouse: Mary Wiley (m. 1962)
- Children: 3
- Education: University of Houston (BBA); Harvard University (MBA)

Military service
- Allegiance: United States
- Branch/service: United States Army Air Force
- Years of service: 1942-1945
- Rank: First Lieutenant
- Battles/wars: World War II
- Awards: Distinguished Flying Cross; Air Medal

Jack Joseph Valenti (September 5, 1921 – April 26, 2007) was an American political advisor and lobbyist who served as a Special Assistant to U.S. President Lyndon B. Johnson. He was also the longtime president of the Motion Picture Association of America. During his 38-year tenure in the MPAA, he created the MPAA film rating system, and was generally regarded as one of the most influential pro-copyright lobbyists in the world.

== Early life and education ==
Valenti was born on September 5, 1921, in Houston, the son of Italian immigrants. He attended Sam Houston High School. During World War II, he was a first lieutenant in the United States Army Air Force. Valenti flew 51 combat missions as the pilot-commander of a North American B-25 Mitchell medium bomber and received four decorations, including the Distinguished Flying Cross and Air Medal.

Valenti graduated from the University of Houston in 1946 with a BA. During his time there, he worked on the staff of the university newspaper, The Daily Cougar, and was president of the university's student government. Valenti would later serve on the university's board of regents.

== Career ==
After earning an M.B.A. from Harvard University in 1948, Valenti worked for Humble Oil in its advertising department, where he helped the company's Texas gas stations jump from fifth to first in sales through a "cleanest restrooms" campaign.

In 1952, he and a partner named Weldon Weekley founded the advertising agency Weekley & Valenti, with oil company Conoco as its first client. In 1956, Valenti met then Senate Majority Leader Lyndon B. Johnson. Weekley & Valenti branched out into political consulting and added Representative Albert Thomas, a Johnson ally, as a client. In 1960, Valenti's firm assisted in the Kennedy-Johnson presidential campaign.

=== Politics ===
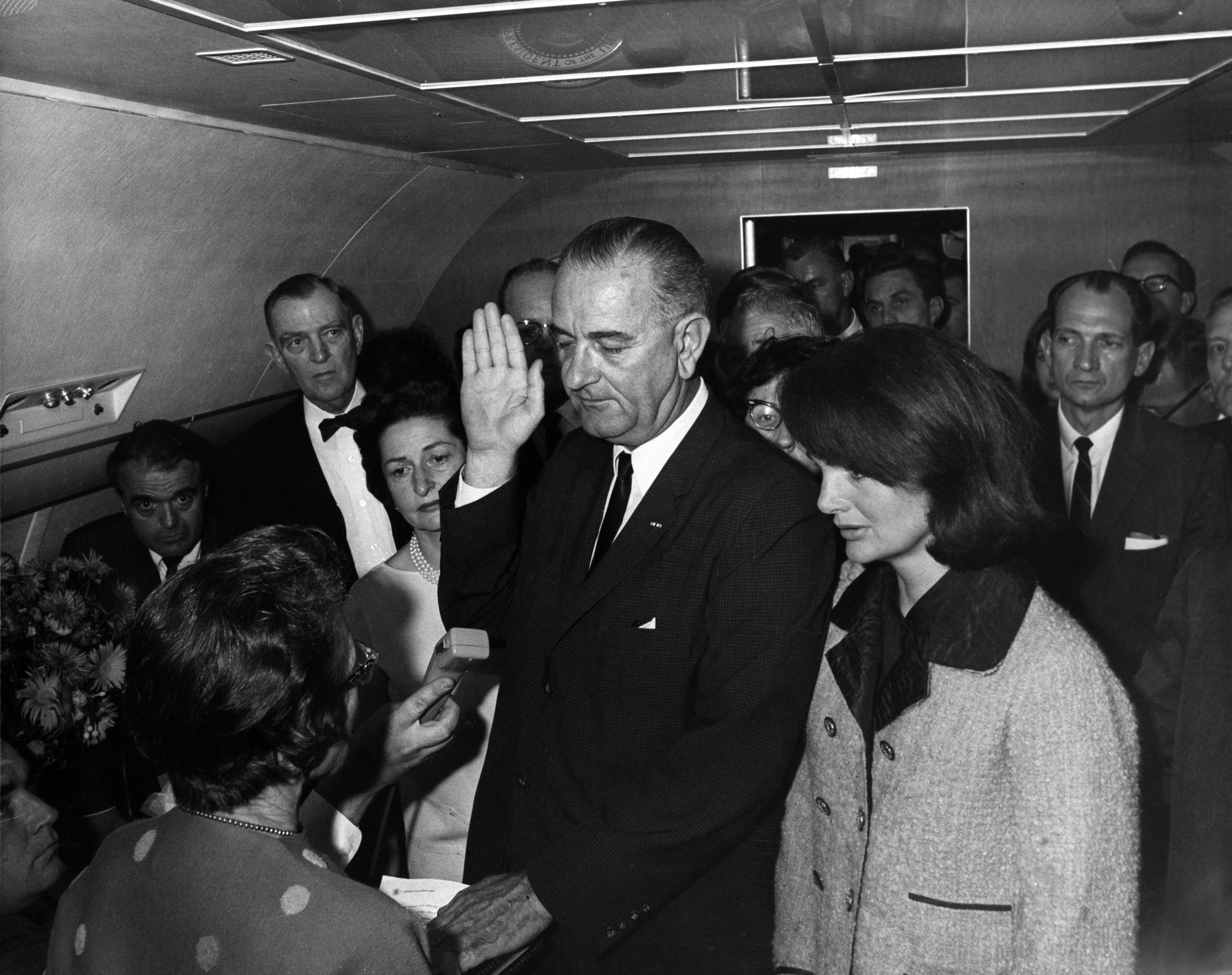
Valenti (far left) was present at Lyndon B. Johnson's swearing in aboard Air Force One.

Valenti served as liaison with the news media during President John F. Kennedy and Vice President Lyndon B. Johnson's November 22, 1963, visit to Dallas, Texas, and Valenti was in the presidential motorcade. Following the assassination of President Kennedy, Valenti was present at Johnson's swearing-in aboard Air Force One, and flew with him to Washington. He then became the first "special assistant" to Johnson's White House and lived there for the first two months of Johnson's presidency. In 1964, Johnson gave Valenti the responsibility to handle relations with the Republican Congressional leadership, particularly Gerald Ford and Charles A. Halleck from the House of Representatives, and the Senate's Everett Dirksen.

Valenti later called Johnson "the most single dominating human being that I've ever been in contact with" and "the single most intelligent man I've ever known". In a speech before the American Advertising Federation in 1965, Valenti said: "I sleep each night a little better, a little more confidently, because Lyndon Johnson is my president."

Valenti later criticized film director Oliver Stone for the 1991 film JFK. He called the film a "monstrous charade" and said, "I owe where I am today to Lyndon Johnson. I could not live with myself if I stood by mutely and let some filmmaker soil his memory."

=== MPAA ===
In 1966, Valenti, at the insistence of Universal Studios chief Lew Wasserman and with Johnson's consent, resigned his White House commission and became president of the Motion Picture Association of America. With Valenti's arrival in Hollywood, the pair were lifelong allies, and together orchestrated and controlled how Hollywood would conduct business for the next several decades.

William F. Patry, a copyright attorney for the Bill Clinton administration, who observed Valenti firsthand says:

His personal passion and extreme comfort around politicians gave him credibility that others ... would lack. Mr Valenti was a consummate salesman, who like all great salesmen ... worked himself up into believing the truth of his clients' message. Those privileged to see Mr Valenti offstage – talking openly with his clients about what could or could not be achieved, and what artifice would or would not work – are aware that Mr Valenti's clients frequently disagreed with his advice and directed him to deliver a different message through a different artifice. [He] was a great actor working on the stage of Washington DC (and sometimes globally) on behalf of an industry that appreciated his craft, but that never let him forget that the message was theirs and not his.

==== Movie rating system ====
In 1968, Valenti developed the MPAA film rating system, which initially comprised four distinct ratings: G, M, R and X. The M rating was soon replaced by GP, and changed to PG in 1972. The X rating immediately proved troublesome, since it was not trademarked and therefore used freely by the pornographic film industry, with which it became most associated. Mainstream films such as Midnight Cowboy and A Clockwork Orange were assumed by the public to be pornographic because they carried the X rating. In 1990, the trademarked "adults only" NC-17 rating was introduced as a replacement for the non-trademarked X-rating. The PG-13 rating was added in 1984 to provide a greater range of distinction for audiences and was first proposed by Steven Spielberg.

==== Valenti on new technologies ====
During the late 1970s and early 1980s, Valenti became notorious for his flamboyant attacks on the Sony Betamax Video Cassette Recorder (VCR), which the MPAA feared would devastate the film industry. He famously told a congressional panel in 1982, "I say to you that the VCR is to the American film producer and the American public as the Boston strangler is to the woman home alone." Despite Valenti's prediction, the home video market became a mainstay of film studio revenues throughout the 1980s and 1990s.

==== Digital Millennium Copyright Act ====
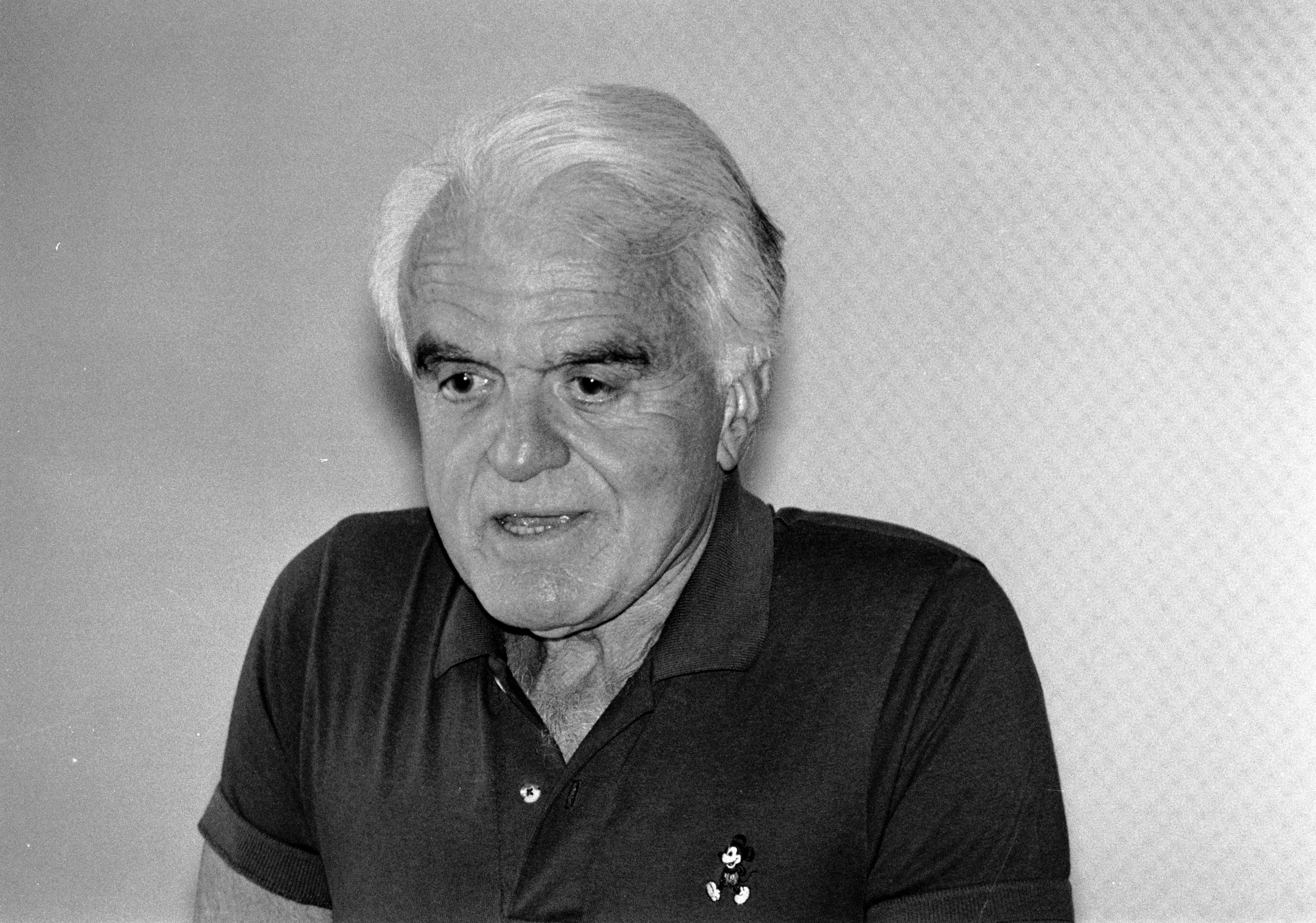
Jack Valenti in 1991

In 1998, Valenti lobbied for the controversial Digital Millennium Copyright Act, arguing that copyright infringement via the Internet would severely damage the record and film industries.

==== 2003 screener ban injunction ====
In 2003, Valenti found himself at the center of the so-called screener debate, as the MPAA barred studios and many independent producers from sending screener copies of their films to critics and voters in various awards shows. Under mounting industry pressure and a court injunction Antidote Int'l Films Inc. et al. v MPAA (November 2003), Valenti backed down in 2004, narrowly avoiding a massive and embarrassing antitrust lawsuit against the MPAA.

The Coalition of Independent Filmmakers' Jeff Levy-Hinte, IFP/Los Angeles executive director Dawn Hudson and IFP/New York executive director Michelle Byrd said in a joint statement, "By obtaining a court order to force the MPAA to lift the screener ban last December, the Coalition enabled individual distributors to determine when and in what manner to distribute promotional screeners." It was viewed as Valenti's greatest professional loss.

=== Honors ===
Valenti received the Distinguished Flying Cross and Air Medal for his service with the Army Air Force during the Second World War. In 1969, Jack Valenti received the Bronze Medallion, New York City's highest civilian honor. In 1985, Jack Valenti received the French Légion d'Honneur.

In 2002, the University of Houston bestowed Valenti an honorary doctorate.

In December 2003, Valenti received the "Legend in Leadership Award" from the Chief Executive Leadership Institute of the Yale School of Management.

In June 2005, the Washington DC headquarters of the Motion Picture Association of America, was renamed the Jack Valenti Building. It is located at 888 16th St. NW, Washington DC, very close to the White House. Jack Valenti maintained an office on the 8th floor, outside the MPAA's space, until his death.

In April 2008, the University of Houston renamed its School of Communication to the Jack J. Valenti School of Communication in his honor. Valenti was one of the school's notable alumni.

== Retirement ==
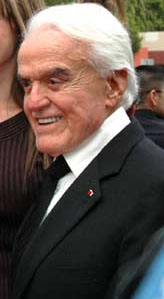
Jack Valenti

Valenti's salary in 2004 was reported to be $1.35 million, which made him the seventh-highest paid Washington trade group chief, according to the National Journal.

Valenti was nominated for President of the United States by the Alfalfa Club in 2004.

In August 2004, Valenti, then 82, retired and was replaced by former U.S. Congressman and Secretary of Agriculture Dan Glickman. The previous head of the ratings system, Joan Graves, was appointed by Valenti.

After retirement from the MPAA, Valenti became involved in technology-related venture capital activities, such as joining the advisory board of Legend Ventures where he advised on media investment opportunities. He also remained a supporter of causes linked to his Italian American heritage and was a member of the National Italian American Foundation (NIAF) for more than 20 years.

After retiring from the MPAA in 2004, Valenti became the first President of Friends of the Global Fight Against AIDS, Tuberculosis, and Malaria, an organization founded by philanthropists Edward W. Scott and Adam Waldman. The founders wanted to support the Global Fund to Fight AIDS, Tuberculosis and Malaria in its work to prevent millions of people from dying of preventable and treatable diseases each year. Under Valenti's leadership, Friends of the Global Fight oversaw a steady increase in U.S. funding for the Global Fund, resulting in a large-scale, positive impact in the fight against AIDS, tuberculosis and malaria. Valenti remained President of Friends of the Global Fight until his death in 2007.

== Personal life ==
Valenti married Mary Margaret Wiley who served on the staff of President Lyndon B. Johnson. They had three children: John, Alexandra, and Courtenay Valenti, who became a Warner Bros. studio executive. He died just before their forty-fifth wedding anniversary.

Nancy Clark Reynolds had been a love interest of Valenti.

In 1964, the Federal Bureau of Investigation conducted an investigation concerning whether Valenti had a sexual relationship with a male photographer, at a time when homosexual acts were still illegal in many parts of the United States. The investigation concluded that there was no evidence of Valenti being homosexual.

=== Death ===
Valenti died from complications of a stroke at his home in Washington on April 26, 2007, at the age of 85. He is buried at Arlington National Cemetery under a veteran's gravestone, which lists both his war decorations and his years as president of the MPAA. His memoirs This Time, This Place: My life in war, the White House and Hollywood were published on May 15, 2007, a few weeks after his death.

Following his death, the National Italian American Foundation (NIAF) launched the NIAF Jack Valenti Institute, which provides support to Italian-American film students, in his memory. Director Martin Scorsese launched the institute at the Foundation's 32nd Anniversary Gala, after receiving an award from Mary Margaret Valenti.

== In popular culture ==
In 1995, Valenti voiced himself in the Freakazoid! episode "The Chip", where he helped recount the origin of the titular hero; he also lectured about the MPAA rating system using stickers of a family, and made frequent references to his cheeks.

In the film Path to War (2002), Jack Valenti is portrayed by his son, John Valenti. In the 2016 film Jackie, about the life of First Lady Jacqueline Kennedy Onassis after Kennedy's assassination, Valenti is portrayed by Max Casella.

== Books ==
- Ten Heroes and Two Heroines (1957)
- The Bitter Taste of Glory (1971)
- A Very Human President (1976; ISBN 0-671-80834-6)
- Protect and Defend (1992; ISBN 0-385-41735-7)
- Speak Up With Confidence (2002; ISBN 0-7868-8750-8)
- This Time This Place (2007; ISBN 0-307-34664-1)

Political offices
Preceded by Kenneth O'Donnell	White House Appointments Secretary; 1963–1965	Succeeded by W. Marvin Watson
Preceded by Bill Moyers; De facto	White House Chief of Staff; De facto 1965–1966	Succeeded by W. Marvin Watson
Non-profit organization positions
Preceded by Eric Johnston	President of the Motion Picture Association of America; 1966–2004	Succeeded by Dan Glickman
