= Shattered Glass (film) =

2003 film by Billy Ray

- Theatrical release poster
- Directed by: Billy Ray
- Screenplay by: Billy Ray
- Based on: "Shattered Glass" by H. G. Bissinger
- Produced by: Craig Baumgarten; Adam Merims; Gaye Hirsch; Tove Christensen
- Starring: Hayden Christensen; Peter Sarsgaard; Chloë Sevigny; Rosario Dawson; Melanie Lynskey; Hank Azaria; Steve Zahn
- Cinematography: Mandy Walker
- Edited by: Jeffrey Ford
- Music by: Mychael Danna
- Production companies: Cruise/Wagner Productions; Baumgarten Merims Productions; Forest Park Pictures
- Distributed by: Lions Gate Films
- Release date: October 31, 2003 (United States)
- Running time: 94 minutes
- Countries: Canada; United States
- Language: English
- Budget: $6 million
- Box office: $2.9 million

Shattered Glass is a 2003 biographical drama film about journalist Stephen Glass and his scandal at The New Republic. Written and directed by Billy Ray in his feature directorial debut, the film is based on a 1998 Vanity Fair article of the same name by H. G. Bissinger and chronicles Glass's fall from grace when a majority of his articles were discovered to be fabricated. It stars Hayden Christensen as Glass, alongside Peter Sarsgaard, Chloë Sevigny, and Steve Zahn.

The film premiered at the 2003 Toronto International Film Festival on September 10, 2003, and received a North American limited release on November 26, 2003. Although a commercial failure, Shattered Glass received acclaim from critics, with particular praise for Christensen and Sarsgaard's performances.

== Plot ==
In 1998, Stephen Glass is an associate editor at The New Republic. The youngest of the magazine's staff, he is popular with his colleagues for his entertaining stories, works collegially with everyone, and feigns a heartfelt self-deprecating style whenever his work is criticized for inaccuracies. Such a case is "Spring Breakdown", detailing a group of Young Republicans engaging in felonious debauchery while attending the annual CPAC. The magazine's editor, Michael Kelly, whom the staff holds strong loyalty towards, backs Glass when he admits to a minor mistake but maintains the rest of the article is factual.

Conflict between Kelly and publisher Marty Peretz results in Peretz firing Kelly. Reporter Charles Lane is promoted by Peretz to replace Kelly, despite being disliked by the staff due to his cold reputation.

Glass writes a story entitled "Hack Heaven" that details a teenage hacker being hired by a software firm he infiltrated. The story reaches Forbes Digital Tool, where reporter Adam Penenberg finds no corroborating evidence. When contacted by Penenberg about being unable to reach Glass's sources, Glass provides a number with a Palo Alto area code for the firm that, when dialed, goes immediately to voicemail. Lane later receives a brief call from an individual who identifies himself as the firm's chair. Glass and Lane also partake in a conference call with the Forbes staff, further eroding the story's credibility and prompting Glass to claim he feels his sources tricked him. Lane calls the Forbes editor and asks him to go ahead and report The New Republic was tricked, but leave Glass out to avoid ruining his career. Meanwhile, Glass whines to his co-workers, eliciting their sympathy against Lane for failing to support him during the earlier Forbes call.

Lane, looking to protect Glass from the Forbes staff, has Glass take him to the convention center where the story took place but learns from a security guard it was closed during the events Glass wrote about. He also discovers that the restaurant where the hackers had dinner afterwards closes in the mid-afternoon. With the story contradicted by this information, Glass tells Lane he only relied on sources for information and falsified his first-hand experiences to improve the story. Due to Glass's popularity with other staff, Lane decides to only suspend, not fire, Glass. That evening, upon discovering that Glass's brother lives in Palo Alto, Lane realizes that Glass had his brother pose as the software firm's chair. After confronting Glass with this knowledge, Lane re-reads Glass's previous stories and realizes that several were falsified. With his deception exposed, Glass is fired by Lane.

Lane initially receives pushback from The New Republic staff, who still believe that Lane was acting harshly and that Glass was duped by the (still missing) hackers, but he convinces them to re-examine Glass's articles. Having done this analysis, the staff support Lane for bringing Glass's deception to light, while the magazine's attorney questions Glass over which stories of his were fabricated. Closing titles reveal that Penenberg's article on Glass was hailed as a breakthrough for internet journalism, The New Republic determined that 27 of Glass's 41 stories were either partially or completely fabricated, Kelly was killed while covering the opening days of the Iraq War, Glass earned a Juris Doctor degree from Georgetown and wrote a novel fictionalizing his own life called The Fabulist, and Lane joined The Washington Post.

== Cast ==
- Hayden Christensen as Stephen Glass
- Peter Sarsgaard as Charles "Chuck" Lane
- Chloë Sevigny as Caitlin Avey
- Rosario Dawson as Andy Fox
- Melanie Lynskey as Amy Brand
- Hank Azaria as Michael Kelly
- Mark Blum as Lewis Estridge
- Simone-Élise Girard as Catarina Bannier
- Chad Donella as David Bach
- Philip Cole as convention center security guard
- Jamie Elman as Aaron Bluth
- Luke Kirby as Rob Gruen
- Steve Zahn as Adam Penenberg

In addition, Ted Kotcheff appears as the magazine's owner and publisher, Marty Peretz.

== Production ==
Producer Craig Baumgarten, working with HBO executive Gaye Hirsch, optioned H.G. Bissinger's Vanity Fair magazine article about Stephen Glass for an HBO original movie. They hired screenwriter Billy Ray based on the script he had written for the TNT film Legalese. Ray grew up with Bob Woodward and Carl Bernstein as his heroes and studied journalism for a year. It was this love for journalism that motivated him to make Shattered Glass. Ray also directed the film.

A sudden change in management put the film into turnaround and it remained inactive for two years until Cruise/Wagner Productions bought it from HBO. They took it to Lionsgate and Ray asked the studio if he could direct in addition to writing it. The challenge for Ray was to make the subject matter watchable because, according to the filmmaker, "watching people write is deadly dull ... in a film like this, dialogue is what a character is willing to reveal about himself, and the camera is there to capture everything else". The breakthrough for Ray came when he realized that the film's real protagonist was not Glass but Chuck Lane. According to Ray, "as fascinating as Stephen Glass is by the end of the movie people would want to kill themselves – you just can't follow him all the way". He used the Bissinger article as a starting point, which gave him a line of dialogue on which to hook the entire character of Glass: "Are you mad at me?" According to Ray, "you can build an entire character around that notion, and we did".

The character of Caitlin Avey is an amalgamation of Glass's friends and The New Republic allies Hanna Rosin and Jonathan Chait.

To prepare for the film, Ray interviewed and re-interviewed key figures for any relevant details. He signed some of them as paid consultants and gave several approval over the script. Early on, he spent a considerable amount of time trying to earn the trust of the people who had worked with Glass and get them to understand that he was going to be objective with the subject matter. The real Michael Kelly was so unhappy about how he was portrayed in Bissinger's article that he threatened to sue when Ray first contacted him about the film and refused for two years to read Ray's script, which he eventually approved. Ray attempted to contact Glass through his lawyers but was unsuccessful. Lionsgate lawyers asked Ray to give them an annotated script where he had to footnote every line of dialogue and every assertion and back them up with corresponding notes.

The night before principal photography began in Montreal, Ray screened All the President's Men for the cast and crew. He shot both halves of the film differently – in the first half, he used hand-held cameras in the scenes that took place in the offices of The New Republic, but when the Forbes editors begin to question Glass, the camerawork was more stable.

Ray's original cut of the film was a much more straightforward account of events, but he became dissatisfied while editing the film and raised additional funds to shoot the high school scenes that bookend the film.

On April 3, 2003, a little more than six months before the film was released, Michael Kelly was killed while reporting on the invasion of Iraq. The film is dedicated to his memory.

== Release ==
Shattered Glass premiered at the Toronto International Film Festival on September 10, 2003. It was also shown at the Telluride Film Festival, the Boston Film Festival, the Woodstock Film Festival, the Mill Valley Film Festival, and the Austin Film Festival. It opened on eight screens in New York City and Los Angeles on October 31, 2003, and received a North American limited release on November 26, 2003.

It grossed $77,540 on its opening weekend. It eventually earned $2,220,008 in North America and $724,744 in other markets for a total worldwide box office of $2,944,752.

== Reception ==
The film received positive reviews from critics. On Rotten Tomatoes, the film has a 92% rating, based on 168 reviews, with an average rating of 7.70/10. The site's consensus states: "A compelling look at Stephen Glass' fall from grace." On Metacritic, the film has a score of 73 out of 100, based on 38 critics.

A. O. Scott of The New York Times described the film as:

a serious, well-observed examination of the practice of journalism ... an astute and surprisingly gripping drama. ... A more showily ambitious film might have tried to delve into Glass's personal history in search of an explanation for his behavior, or to draw provocative connections between that behavior and the cultural and political climate of the times. Such a movie would also have been conventional, facile and ultimately false. Mr Ray knows better than to sensationalize a story about the dangers of sensationalism. Shattered Glass is good enough to be true.

Roger Ebert of the Chicago Sun-Times gave the film three-and-a-half out of four and felt the film was well-cast and "deserves comparison with All the President's Men among movies about journalism". In a dissenting review from The Village Voice, J. Hoberman dismissed the film as "self-important yet insipid" and asks, "Shattered Glass begs a larger question: What sort of culture elevates Glass for his entertainment value, punishes him for being too entertaining, rewards his notoriety, and then resurrects him again as a moral object lesson?"

Sarsgaard's performance as Charles Lane was singled out by several critics for praise. USA Today gave the film three-and-a-half out of four and wrote of him: "Sarsgaard deserves more credit than he'll probably get for his multi-layered performance". Premiere's Glenn Kenny wrote, "it's Peter Sarsgaard, as the editor who serves Glass his just deserts, who walks away with the picture, metamorphosing his character's stiffness into a moral indignation that's jolting and, finally, invigorating". His performance ended up winning numerous awards, including "Best Supporting Actor" citations from the Boston Society of Film Critics, Kansas City Film Critics Circle, National Society of Film Critics, Online Film Critics Society, San Francisco Film Critics Circle, and the Toronto Film Critics Association, as well as nominations from the Independent Spirit Awards and the Golden Globes. The A.V. Club placed his portrayal of Chuck Lane at number six on a list of the best performances of the decade.

Stephen Glass saw the film and, when reflecting about the experience, he said, "It was very painful for me. It was like being on a guided tour of the moments of my life I am most ashamed of".

== Awards and nominations ==
Award	Category	Recipient	Result	Ref.
Boston Society of Film Critics Awards	Best Supporting Actor	Peter Sarsgaard	Won	
Chicago Film Critics Association Awards	Best Supporting Actor	Peter Sarsgaard	Nominated	
Golden Globes Awards	Best Supporting Actor - Motion Picture	Peter Sarsgaard	Nominated	
Independent Spirit Awards	Best Film	Craig Baumgarten, Tove Christensen, Gaye Hirsch, Adam Merims	Nominated	
Independent Spirit Awards	Best Screenplay	Billy Ray	Nominated	
Independent Spirit Awards	Best Supporting Male	Peter Sarsgaard	Nominated	
Independent Spirit Awards	Best Cinematography	Mandy Walker	Nominated	
Kansas Film Critics Circle Awards	Best Supporting Actor	Peter Sarsgaard	Won	
Las Palmas de Gran Canaria International Film Festival Awards	Best Actor	Peter Sarsgaard, Hayden Christensen	Won	
National Society of Film Critics Awards	Best Supporting Actor	Peter Sarsgaard	Won	
San Francisco Film Critics Circle Awards	Best Supporting Actor	Peter Sarsgaard	Won	
Satellite Awards	Best Adapted Screenplay	Billy Ray	Nominated	
Satellite Awards	Best Actor - Motion Picture Drama	Hayden Christensen	Nominated	
Toronto Film Critics Association Awards	Best Supporting Actor	Peter Sarsgaard	Won	
Washington D.C. Area Film Critics Association Awards	Best Supporting Actor	Peter Sarsgaard	Nominated	
Washington D.C. Area Film Critics Association Awards	Best Adapted Screenplay	Billy Ray	Nominated	
