= The Day Freedom Died =

2008 book by Charles Lane

The Day Freedom Died: The Colfax Massacre, the Supreme Court, and the Betrayal of Reconstruction
- Author: Charles Lane
- Language: English
- Subject: United States History
- Publisher: Henry Holt and Co.
- Publication date: March 4, 2008
- Publication place: United States
- Pages: 352
- ISBN: 978-080508342-2
- Website: us.macmillan.com/books/9780805089226/thedayfreedomdied

The Day Freedom Died: The Colfax Massacre, the Supreme Court, and the Betrayal of Reconstruction is a book by Charles Lane published in 2008 by Henry Holt and Company, now operating under Macmillan Publishers.

== Synopsis ==
The book describes events leading up to and during the Colfax massacre in Grant Parish, Louisiana, on Easter Sunday, 1873, in which dozens of African Americans were killed at the hands of white supremacists, as well as the subsequent manhunt, trial, and appeal to the United States Supreme Court, in which the Court in a unanimous decision in United States v. Cruikshank (1876) overturned the convictions that had been obtained against three of the original ninety-eight defendants who had been indicted, nine of whom had been brought to trial.

== Reception ==
Some reviewers praised the book. For instance, Kirkus Reviews found the book "An exciting, swift-moving narrative, replete with characters both dastardly and noble," Publishers Weekly declared, "fans of American history will find it a moving and instructive drama," Michelle Kung writing in Entertainment Weekly found that the author "shines an illuminating light on one of America's more sordid events," and Vanessa Bush writing in Booklist stated, "Lane’s account of the Colfax Massacre is compelling in its scope and detail of a shameful chapter in U.S. history."

Other reviews, while generally favorable, did express some criticisms. W. Scott Poole, who wrote a generally favorable review at H-Net Reviews, took exception to Lane's "strange decision to use the terms 'colored' and 'negro' throughout his work." Robert Caldwell, writing in Against the Current, found the book "an excellent resource" on the subject matter, while faulting it for focusing too much on "the important men of the day," which Caldwell said resulted in the book missing "much of the class and political dynamics." He also found the book "legalistic and more difficult to read" (than the other book about the same events that he was reviewing).

Writing in The Army Lawyer, Maj. Phillip Griffith gave the book a mixed review, writing, "While the book is initially difficult to read, its methodical description of one man's quest for justice in the face of numerous obstacles merits belated honor to his memory," and found Lane "misses the mark when he fails to convincingly establish one of the main premises of the book-that the Supreme Court's decision in United States v. Cruikshank was wrong." And John G. Turner, writing in the academic journal Reviews in American History, felt that Lane overstated the significance of the book and struggled "to fully comprehend what motivated the killers."
