= Michael Kelly (editor) =

American journalist (1957–2003)

- Born: March 17, 1957; Washington, D.C., U.S.
- Died: April 4, 2003 (aged 46); Baghdad Governorate, Iraq
- Cause of death: War-related vehicular accident
- Resting place: Mount Auburn Cemetery, Hibiscus Path, Lot no. 10740; 42°22′20.7″N 71°8′44.3″W
- Education: University of New Hampshire (BA)
- Occupations: Journalist; author; columnist; editor
- Years active: 1983–2003
- Known for: Reporting during the Persian Gulf War
- Notable work: Martyrs' Day: Chronicle of a Small War (1993); Things Worth Fighting For: Collected Writings (2004)
- Spouse: Madelyn Greenberg (m. 1991)
- Children: 2
- Awards: Martha Albrand Award; National Magazine Awards

Michael Thomas Kelly (March 17, 1957 – April 4, 2003) was an American journalist for The New York Times, a columnist for The Washington Post and The New Yorker, and a magazine editor for The New Republic, National Journal, and The Atlantic. He came to prominence through his reporting on the 1990–1991 Gulf War, and was well known for his political profiles and commentary. He suffered professional embarrassment for his role as senior editor in the Stephen Glass scandal at The New Republic. Kelly was killed in 2003 while covering the invasion of Iraq; he was the first American journalist to die during the war.

During a journalism career that spanned 20 years, Kelly received a number of professional awards for his book on the Gulf War and his articles, as well as for his magazine editing. In his honor, the Michael Kelly Award for journalism was established, as well as a scholarship at his alma mater, the University of New Hampshire.

== Early life and education ==
Born in Washington, D.C. as one of four children, Kelly followed both of his parents into journalism. His mother is Marguerite (Lelong) Kelly, a columnist from New Orleans who wrote "The Family Almanac" for The Washington Post, and his father was Thomas Vincent Kelly (August 2, 1923 – June 17, 2010), a political and features reporter for The Washington Star, formerly The Washington Daily News, and later for The Washington Times.

Kelly attended Gonzaga College High School, as his father had done. He graduated in 1979 from the University of New Hampshire, where he worked for the college newspaper, The New Hampshire, and graduated with a Bachelor of Arts in history.

== Career ==
Kelly's first media job was booking guests for ABC News and its Good Morning America television program. He was a newspaper journalist for The Cincinnati Post (1983–1986), The Baltimore Sun (1986–1989) and later, after writing freelance and reporting in the first Gulf War, he worked for The New York Times (1992–1994). While he worked freelance, his articles were published in The Boston Globe and GQ. The New Republic published his reporting on the Persian Gulf War in 1991. He was a staff writer for The New York Times Magazine. In 1994, he joined The New Yorker and wrote its "Letter From Washington" column until his departure in 1996.

At that point in his career, Kelly had worked with editors such as Hendrik Hertzberg at The New Republic, Robert Vare at The New York Times Magazine and Tina Brown at The New Yorker. In 1996, Kelly became the editor of The New Republic, where his protectiveness of his staffers, along with the criticisms he leveled against publisher Martin Peretz's friend Al Gore, created friction with the magazine's management. He was dismissed after less than a year as editor.

Writer Stephen Glass had been a major contributor under Kelly's editorship; Glass was later shown to have fabricated numerous stories, and falsified his notes and other backup materials. The New Republic issued a public apology for this breach of journalism ethics after it was revealed by an investigation by Kelly's successor, Charles Lane. Forbes Online had published an exposé of Glass' work. Kelly was Glass's editor before Forbes exposed the latter's falsehoods. He was largely supportive of Glass, sending scathing letters to those who challenged the veracity of Glass's stories. In the 2003 film Shattered Glass, which chronicles Glass's rise and fall at The New Republic, Kelly was portrayed by Hank Azaria.

After losing his job at The New Republic, Kelly was hired by David G. Bradley to write a column for the National Journal. He was later promoted to editor. After Bradley purchased The Atlantic Monthly in 1999, he hired Kelly to run it. The Atlantic won three National Magazine Awards under Kelly's leadership and two more after his death.

=== Martyrs' Day: Chronicle of a Small War ===
External videos
- Booknotes interview with Kelly on Martyr's Day: Chronicle of a Small War, March 28, 1993, C-SPAN

Kelly won awards and accolades for his 1991 coverage of the first Gulf War. The United States military used a pool management system to organize reporters, control access, and gain favorable coverage, but Kelly opted out of that system in favor of independent reporting. His experience during Operation Desert Storm later served as the basis for his book Martyrs' Day: Chronicle of a Small War (1993). His reporting on the war for The New Republic had already won a National Magazine Award and the Overseas Press award.

His book received the PEN/Martha Albrand Award for First Nonfiction in 1994. Ted Koppel compared Kelly's book to journalist Michael Herr's Dispatches, saying that Kelly had captured the Gulf War in print as definitively as Herr had the Vietnam War.

The New Yorker's David Remnick said Kelly's journalistic account, describing horror during war, belonged to the same genre as George Orwell's Homage to Catalonia about the Spanish Civil War or Ernie Pyle's reporting during World War II. Hertzberg of The New Republic said "Highway to Hell", which appeared April 1, 1991, was "most memorable", and Vare of The Atlantic praised the same article for its "emotional impact."

=== Profile of Hillary Clinton ===
Kelly wrote "Saint Hillary" for The New York Times Magazine in 1993. In 2005, Matt Bai writing for The New York Times referred to it as "what became a famous article about Hillary Clinton" in his preface to his description. In Columbia Journalism Review, Gal Beckerman referred to it as a "mocking cover story".

=== Death ===
Kelly wanted to report on the start of the Iraq War in 2003. For this war, the U.S. military embedded journalists into coalition military units and Kelly acceded to this approach, as did approximately 600 other journalists. Kelly was assigned to the same unit as journalist Ted Koppel of ABC Nightline. On April 3, 2003, a few weeks following the 2003 invasion of Iraq, U.S. forces were 6–10 miles (10–20 km) from the Baghdad International Airport and the center of Baghdad. Koppel, in his preface to Things Worth Fighting For: Collected Writings, said that he and Kelly learned that securing the airport was the 3rd Infantry Division's mission on the night when he last saw Kelly alive.

During that invasion, Kelly was traveling in a Humvee vehicle with Staff Sergeant Wilbert Davis, a 15-year U.S. Army veteran, when the vehicle was fired upon by Iraqi soldiers. The vehicle carrying Kelly and Davis veered off an embankment and into a canal below. Both men died in the attack. Kelly was the first U.S. reporter officially killed in action in Iraq.

== Views ==
Kelly was critical of the political establishment in both political parties, as well as of the power structure in Hollywood. He wrote a critique of Ted Kennedy that was published in GQ in 1990 and reprinted by that magazine upon Kennedy's death. He skewered Al Gore numerous times over the years. He supported U.S. military intervention during both the presidencies of Bill Clinton and George W. Bush. He was an outspoken critic of the anti-Iraq war movement. Kelly coined the term "fusion paranoia" to refer to what he considered a political convergence of both left and right-wing activists on anti-war issues and civil liberties, which he claimed were motivated by a shared belief in conspiracism or anti-government views.

In September 2002, Kelly sharply criticized Gore (the former vice president of the Clinton administration) for a speech that condemned the George W. Bush administration's efforts to generate support for the coming invasion of Iraq. In a column in The Washington Post, Kelly wrote Gore's speech was "wretched", "vile", and "contemptible". He said Gore's speech "was one no decent politician could have delivered" and was "bereft of anything other than taunts and jibes and embarrassingly obvious lies." In 2013, journalist James Fallows, who had worked with Kelly and was close to him, said that Kelly's attack on Gore "was not merely wrong. It was 'dishonest, cheap, low.'"

== Personal life ==
Kelly met his wife Madelyn Greenberg, a producer at CNN and CBS News, during the 1988 presidential election while they were both assigned to the Dukakis campaign. Later, Greenberg was assigned to the Gulf War and Kelly followed, working on his own reporting project. The couple married in 1991, and had two children. His father, Thomas V. Kelly, was working on a book about his son Michael, but he died June 17, 2010, before its completion. One of his sisters, Katy Kelly, is a former journalist at People magazine and USA Today. She writes the Lucy Rose and Melonhead series of children's books. She has said that her Melonhead character was partly inspired by her brother Michael. Another sister, Meg Kelly, is a screenwriter.

== Legacy and honors ==
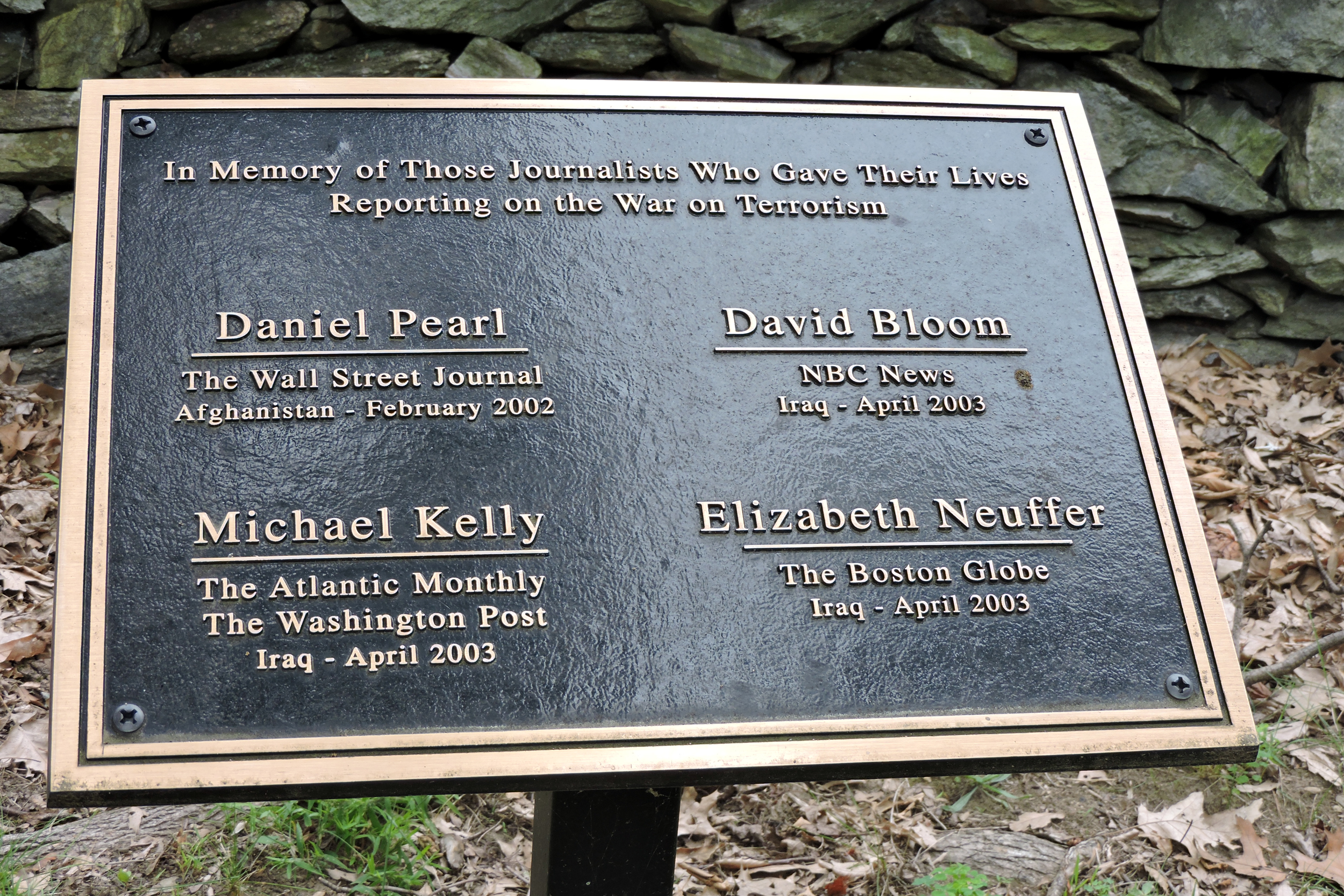
Plaque at National War Correspondents Memorial, Gathland State Park

External videos
- "Tribute to Michael Kelly", hosted by Politics and Prose Bookstore, April 21, 2004, C-SPAN

Kelly's legacy remains divided. On one side, he is remembered as a journalist who "stood for truth, and died for his beliefs". On the other hand, he has been criticized for his vocal support for the invasion of Iraq, which ended in an eight-year insurgency against American troops and the reformed Iraqi forces, an event partially attributed by some to a press perceived as being not critical enough.

Combined as it was with his support of Stephen Glass during his scandal, Gawker editor Tom Scocca said that Kelly had the "distinction of an active role in two of the worst failures of journalism in a generation." Scocca further wrote: "It's not simply that Kelly was wrong, nor that he was wrong about important things. It's that he was aggressively, manipulatively, and smugly wrong."

The Atlantic Media Company, owner of the publications for which Kelly worked from 1997 to 2003, annually honors journalists with the Michael Kelly Award, which recognizes a journalist for "the fearless pursuit and expression of truth". In 2003 the University of New Hampshire English department established the Michael Kelly Memorial Scholarship Fund, which awards a sophomore or junior student "who is passionate about journalism".

Michael Kelly's name, along with those of Daniel Pearl, Elizabeth Neuffer and David Bloom, was added to the National War Correspondents Memorial in Gathland State Park, Burkittsville, Maryland—to honor fallen post-9/11 journalists who covered the war on terrorism. His name is also listed on the journalists' memorial in the Newseum in Washington, D.C. Kelly was interred at Mount Auburn Cemetery, Cambridge, Massachusetts. Kelly's collected works were published posthumously as Things Worth Fighting For: Collected Writings (2004).

=== Michael Kelly Award ===
The Michael Kelly Award, sponsored by the Atlantic Media Company, is awarded for "the fearless pursuit and expression of truth"; the prize is $25,000 for the winner and $3,000 for the runners-up.
