= Cowboys (2020 film) =

2020 American drama film by Anna Kerrigan

- Film poster
- Directed by: Anna Kerrigan
- Written by: Anna Kerrigan
- Produced by: Gigi Graff; Anna Kerrigan; Dylan Sellers; Chris Parker
- Starring: Steve Zahn; Jillian Bell; Sasha Knight; Ann Dowd
- Cinematography: John Wakayama Carey
- Edited by: Jarrah Gurrie
- Music by: Gene Back
- Production company: Limelight
- Distributed by: Samuel Goldwyn Films
- Release dates: August 22, 2020 (Outfest); February 12, 2021 (United States)
- Running time: 83 minutes
- Country: United States
- Language: English

Cowboys is a 2020 American drama film written and directed by Anna Kerrigan. It stars Steve Zahn, Jillian Bell, Sasha Knight and Ann Dowd.

It had its world premiere at Outfest on August 22, 2020, and was released on February 12, 2021, by Samuel Goldwyn Films.

== Plot ==
Joe, a transgender boy, accompanies his father Troy on a journey across the Montana wilderness on their way to Canada. Joe's mother, and estranged wife of Troy, Sally, wakes up to find Joe gone, leading her to report the incident to the police. Sally talks to Detective Erickson who requests a recent picture of Joe. Sally produces a picture of Joe which shows him with long hair and in feminine clothing. Erickson refers to Joe as Sally's daughter, a statement which Sally agrees with.

In a series of flashbacks, Joe's childhood leading up to his disappearance is explored. From an early age, Joe connects with his father and enjoys his stories about cowboys. Sally meanwhile pushes traditional gender ideals on Joe, making him wear dresses, like the color pink, and dissuades his fascination with cowboys. One night, Joe comes out to Troy about his dissatisfaction with his gender and his desire to act like a boy. When Troy informs Sally, she refuses to accept it and tells Joe to follow God's path.

Some time later in a western clothing store, Troy lets Joe try on traditionally-male cowboy attire. When Joe's cousin and uncle come into the store, the cousin sneaks into Joe's dressing room and says he looks like a dyke in his outfit. Troy aggressively yells at him for his comments and in the heat of the moment pushes Joe's uncle down a flight of stairs. Troy is subsequently sent to prison, and while there Sally and Joe continue to be adversarial about his gender identity. After Troy is released, he and Sally separate and she eventually refuses to let him visit Joe anymore. In response, Joe cuts his hair and Sally proceeds to slap him across the face. As Joe is distraught, Troy agrees to Joe's plan for the two of them to run away to find a better home for Joe.

In the present, Troy and Joe first travel to Troy's drug-addiction rehabilitation counselor Robert. Robert is shocked by their arrival but lets them stay the night after Troy's truck breaks down. In the morning Troy and Joe take Robert's horse. Detective Erickson tracks down Troy's truck, but Robert covers for them and claims he never saw Joe with Troy. In the wilderness, Joe attempts to fish for food at night after he becomes hungry. As he wades into the water he is taken by the current, prompting Troy to try and rescue him. After the two make it back to shore Troy realizes he lost the prescription drugs he had been taking, causing him to go through withdrawal.

Approaching the Canadian border, the two become lost as Troy becomes increasingly frantic. Detective Erickson finally tracks them down, but as she tries to reason with them another officer shoots Troy. Some time later, Joe lives with a more accepting Sally, who lets him wear traditionally-male clothing and refers to him using his preferred pronouns. The two visit Troy, who is in prison and getting treatment for his drug addiction. As Joe returns to school, all the children on the bus want to know about Joe's trips with his dad.

== Cast ==
- Steve Zahn as Troy
- Jillian Bell as Sally
- Sasha Knight as Joe
- Ann Dowd as Detective Faith Erickson
- Gary Farmer as Robert Spottedbird
- Chris Coy as Jerry
- A.J. Slaght as Stevie
- Bob Stephenson as Sheriff George Jenkins
- John Beasley as Ben the Friendly Ranger
- John Reynolds as Grover

== Production ==
In an interview with PopMatters, Kerrigan said that there had never been any doubt about casting a non-binary or transgender actor to portray the role of Joe, and that after finding newcomer Sasha Knight, "it was obvious that he was our Joe."

== Release ==
Cowboys had its world premiere at the LGBTQ-oriented film festival Outfest on August 22, 2020, and shortly thereafter Samuel Goldwyn Films acquired distribution rights for it. The film had originally been set to have its world premiere at the Tribeca Film Festival in April 2020, however, due to the COVID-19 pandemic, the festival was cancelled. It was eventually released on February 12, 2021.

== Critical response ==
On review aggregator website Rotten Tomatoes, the film holds an approval rating of 92% based on 66 reviews, with an average rating of 7.4/10. The site's critical consensus reads, "Cowboys explores emotionally charged themes with a steady hand, highlighting the humanity of its characters in a story of fraught family dynamics and gender identity."
