= Joan Graves =

American media professional (born 1941)

Joan Eldridge Graves (born 1941/1942) is an American media professional who served as a senior vice president Motion Picture Association of America and chair of its Classification and Ratings Administration.

Graves studied political science at Stanford University and worked as a real estate agent. She was recommended for a position on the ratings board in 1988, and was appointed to lead the administration in 2000 by Jack Valenti. In that capacity, she personally hired all the other members of the ratings administration, and was the only one whose identity was disclosed to the public. Graves held the position until retiring in May 2019. Graves has defended the Administration's rating system against critics who accuse it of being too lenient toward violence, saying that when the MPAA surveys parents, "What we find with the violence category is that they think they're getting correct information from us."
