= Adam Penenberg =

American journalist

- Born: July 27, 1962 (age 63)
- Occupation: Journalist

Adam L. Penenberg (born July 27, 1962) is an American journalist and educator, currently associate professor of journalism at New York University and director of undergraduate studies. He had previously served as editor of PandoDaily and written for Forbes, Fast Company, The New York Times, Wired News, and Playboy. While at Forbes, Penenberg gained national attention in 1998 for helping reveal The New Republic reporter Stephen Glass had been fabricating his stories.

== Education ==
Penenberg received his B.A. in Economics from Reed College.

== Career ==
=== Stephen Glass scandal ===
In the summer of 1998, Penenberg, then a reporter with Forbes magazine's online arm, Forbes Digital Tool, came upon a story in The New Republic about a Silicon Valley firm which was hacked by a teenager, then hired the hacker as a security consultant. Amazed that The New Republic had somehow managed to scoop Forbes, Penenberg tried to verify it. Penenberg could not find any evidence that the company, Jukt Micronics, even existed. He also could not verify any of the events that Glass claimed resulted from the hacker's hiring, such as a radio spot from concerned Nevada state officials or several joint state efforts to combat hacking. After an internal investigation, The New Republic determined that Glass had fabricated the story and subsequently fired him.

=== Other activities ===
As of 2005, Penenberg is an assistant professor of journalism at New York University. He is also a freelance writer for Fast Company, The New York Times, Forbes, Wired News, and Playboy.

He is the author of numerous books

- Tragic Indifference: One Man's Battle With the Auto Industry Over the Dangers of SUVs (2003). About the biggest product liability case in history, the Ford and Firestone controversy, currently being made into a movie.
- Spooked: Espionage In Corporate America (2008). Co-authored with Marc Barry.
- Viral Loop: From Facebook to Twitter, How Today's Smartest Businesses Grow Themselves. (2009) This book explains how companies such as Netscape, eBay, PayPal, Skype, Hotmail, Facebook, and Twitter implemented viral loops to grow exponentially and achieve billion-dollar valuations in only a short amount of time. The book is divided into three sections including viral businesses, marketing, and networks.
- Trial and Terror (2012) A thriller.
- Play at Work: How Games Inspire Breakthrough Thinking (2013) Nonfiction.
- Virtually True (2014) A thriller.
- Sky Rivals: Two Men. Two Planes. An Epic Race Around the World (2016) Nonfiction

== In popular culture ==
Penenberg was portrayed by Steve Zahn in the movie Shattered Glass.
