= Steve Zahn =

American actor (born 1967)

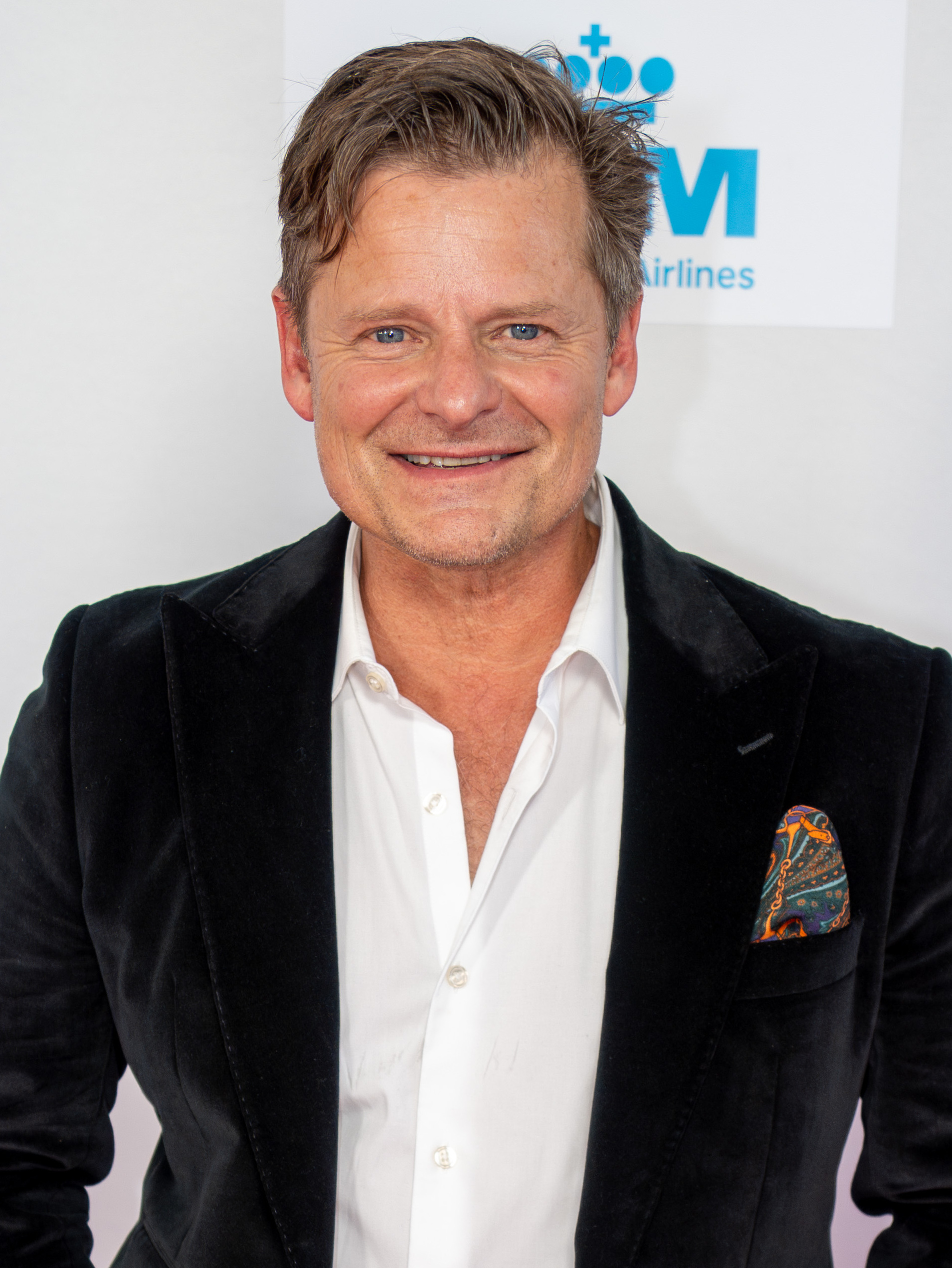
- Zahn at the 2025 Tribeca Festival
- Born: Steven James Zahn; November 13, 1967 (age 59); Marshall, Minnesota, U.S.
- Education: Harvard University (MFA)
- Occupation: Actor
- Years active: 1990–present
- Spouse: Robyn Peterman (m. 1994)
- Children: 2

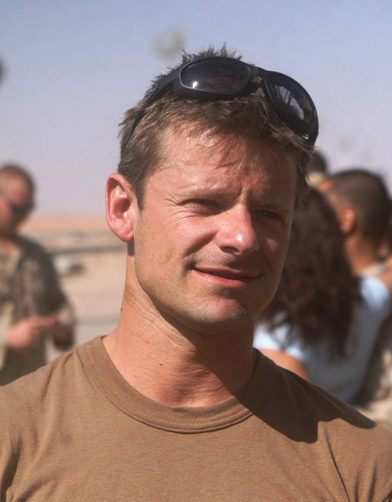
Zahn in 2008

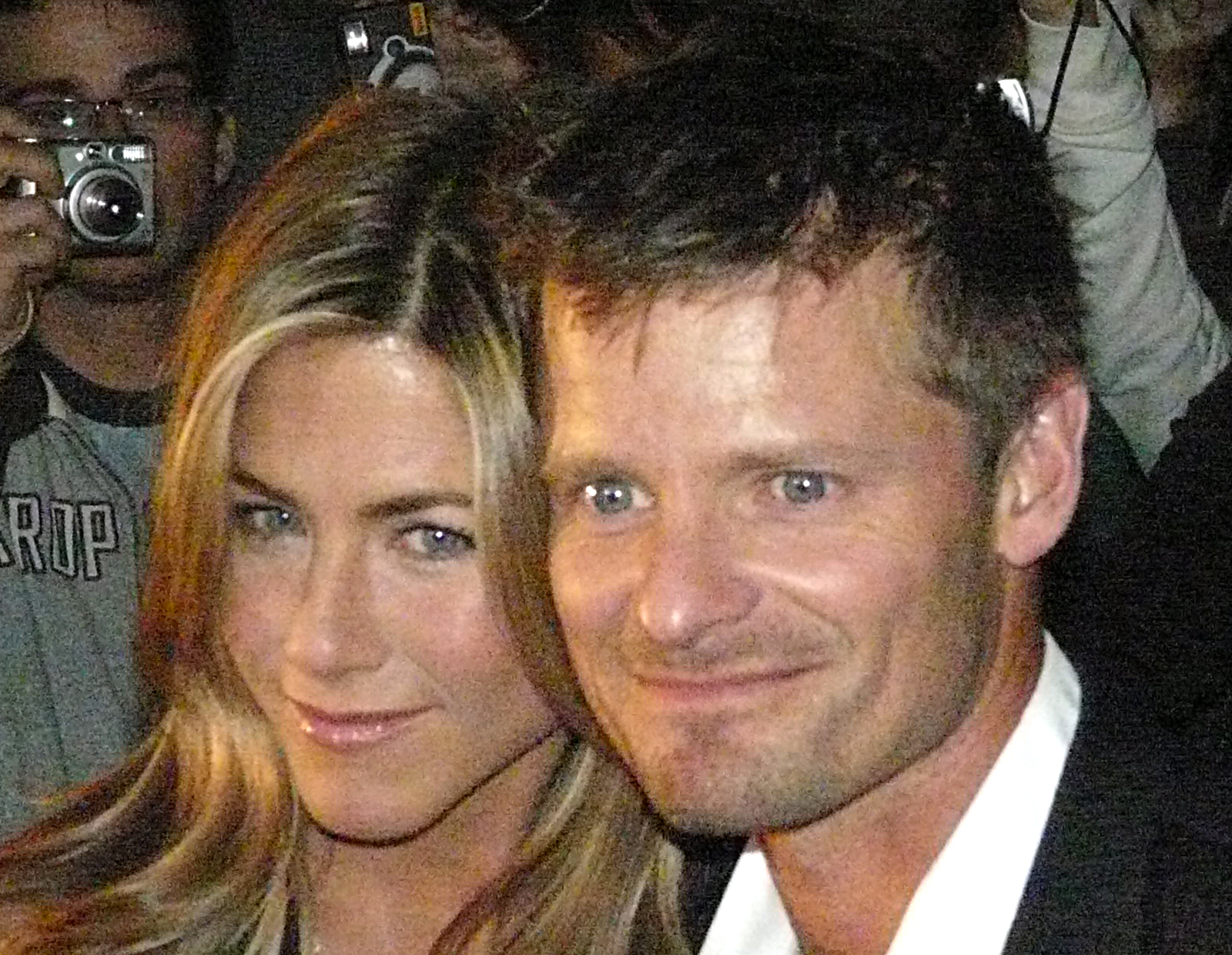
Zahn with Jennifer Aniston at the premiere of their 2008 movie Management

Steven James Zahn (/zɑːn/ ZAHN; born November 13, 1967) is an American actor and comedian. In film, Zahn is best known for his lead roles in That Thing You Do! (1996), Safe Men (1998), Happy, Texas (1999), Joy Ride (2001), National Security (2003), A Perfect Getaway (2009), the Diary of a Wimpy Kid film series (2010–2012), Cowboys (2020), and LaRoy, Texas (2023). His notable supporting roles in films include Reality Bites (1994), Out of Sight (1998), Forces of Nature (1999), Employee of the Month (2004), the Stuart Little film series (1999–2002), Riding in Cars with Boys (2001), Daddy Day Care (2003), Chicken Little (2005), Sahara (2005), Sunshine Cleaning (2008), Dallas Buyers Club (2013), The Good Dinosaur (2015), Captain Fantastic (2016), War for the Planet of the Apes (2017) and Anaconda (2025).

In television, Zahn is best known for his main cast credits as Davis McAlary in the HBO series Treme (2010–2013), Cobi in the Amazon Prime Video series Mad Dogs (2015–2016), Jude Ellis in the ABC science fiction series The Crossing (2018), and Mark Mossbacher in season 1 of the HBO anthology series The White Lotus (2021).

Zahn received an Independent Spirit Award, a Primetime Emmy Award nomination for The White Lotus, as well as two Screen Actors Guild Awards.

Zahn also starred in the series Chad Powers.

== Early life and education ==
Steven James Zahn was born on November 13, 1967, in Marshall, Minnesota, the son of Carleton Edward Zahn, a Lutheran minister, and Zelda Clair Zahn, a bookstore clerk and later a YMCA administrator.

Zahn spent part of his childhood in Mankato, Minnesota, attending Kennedy Elementary School, and moved to the suburbs of Minneapolis for high school, where he acted in school plays and became a two-time Minnesota state speech champion. Zahn graduated from Robbinsdale Cooper High School in New Hope in 1986, planning to eventually join the United States Marine Corps.

He attended Gustavus Adolphus College for one semester, but dropped out after seeing the original West End production of Victor Hugo's Les Misérables. Zahn later enrolled in the Institute for Advanced Theater Training at Harvard University, earning a Master of Fine Arts.

== Career ==
In 1991, Zahn made his professional stage debut in a Minnesota production of Neil Simon's Biloxi Blues after falsely claiming to be a member of Actors' Equity. His fellow actors suggested that he study acting, inspiring him to enroll in American Repertory Theater's two-year training program. At A.R.T., Zahn worked with the stage director Andrei Șerban.

In 1991, Zahn formed the Malaparte theater company with a group of actor friends, including Ethan Hawke and Robert Sean Leonard. From 1991 to 1992, Zahn played Hugo Peabody in a national tour of Bye Bye Birdie starring Tommy Tune. He subsequently appeared in two Off-Broadway plays, Sophistry and Eric Bogosian's Suburbia.

After his breakout film role in 1994's Reality Bites, Zahn quickly gained a reputation for playing amiable stoners, slackers, and sidekicks in films such as That Thing You Do! (1996), You've Got Mail (1998), and Out of Sight (1998). In the 1990s, Zahn was often approached by fans who assumed he was an archetypal Generation X slacker, which was not the case. Zahn has said, "I'm the guy who gets up at six without an alarm clock. I was always that guy."

In 1999, Zahn landed his first starring role in the critically acclaimed indie film Happy, Texas where he played Jake Sullivan, for which he won a Special Jury Award at the Sundance Film Festival. After that, he began playing darker, more nuanced characters. He received Oscar buzz for his role as Drew Barrymore's deadbeat ex in Riding in Cars with Boys (2001), and played investigative journalist Adam Penenberg in Shattered Glass (2003), which starred Hayden Christensen, Peter Sarsgaard, and Chloë Sevigny. A longtime Werner Herzog fan, Zahn campaigned for the role of Vietnam prisoner of war Duane W. Martin in Herzog's 2007 film Rescue Dawn; to prepare for the role, he lost 40 pounds (18 kg) by eating mostly raw food.

Zahn has also worked regularly in television, playing Davis McClary on 36 episodes of HBO's Treme.

From 2010 to 2012, Zahn portrayed Frank Heffley, the father of Greg Heffley, in the Diary of a Wimpy Kid film series.

In 2017, Zahn played Bad Ape in War for the Planet of the Apes. He researched the role by watching chimpanzee videos on YouTube, and later said that the motion capture process and lengthy digital takes made Bad Ape "the most challenging acting job I've ever had".

In 2024 Zahn portrayed Jimmy Conroy / "Solo" as a main character in the second season of the Apple TV+ series Silo. He continued in that role through the fourth and final season of the award-winning science fiction dystopian drama.

== Awards ==
Award	Year	Category	Work	Result
Blockbuster Entertainment Award	2008	Favorite Supporting Actor – Comedy/Romance	Forces of Nature	Nominated
Independent Spirit Awards	1999	Best Supporting Male	Happy, Texas	Won
Independent Spirit Awards	2007	Best Supporting Male	Rescue Dawn	Nominated
Cinequest Film & Creativity Festival	2026	Maverick Spirit Awards		Won
Primetime Emmy Awards	2022	Outstanding Supporting Actor in a Limited or Anthology Series or Movie	The White Lotus	Nominated
Satellite Award	2000	Best Actor	Happy, Texas	Nominated
Screen Actors Guild Awards	2013	Outstanding Performance by a Cast in a Motion Picture	Dallas Buyers Club	Nominated
Screen Actors Guild Awards	2016	Outstanding Performance by a Cast in a Motion Picture	Captain Fantastic	Nominated
Sundance Film Festival	1999	Special Dramatic Jury Prize for Best Comedic Performance	Happy, Texas	Won
Washington D.C. Area Film Critics Association	2017	Best Motion Capture Performance	War for the Planet of the Apes	Nominated

== Personal life ==
Zahn met author and theater artist Robyn Peterman, the daughter of clothier J. Peterman, while they were performing in a national tour of Bye Bye Birdie in 1991. They married in 1994 and have two children. In the 1990s, they bought a cabin in Pennsylvania and then a farm in New Jersey, near the Delaware Water Gap. They next moved to a 36-acre horse farm outside Lexington, Kentucky, where Zahn gardens and raises horses, goats, and sheep. He and his wife also run a local community theater, in which Zahn occasionally performs. He also has a lake cabin near Pine City, Minnesota, where he enjoys tubing and fishing with his children. Zahn is a Lutheran.

Zahn is a lifelong military history buff and has said that one of his biggest regrets was having turned down a role in the HBO miniseries Band of Brothers. In 2007, he was awarded an honorary Ph.D. in Fine Arts from Northern Kentucky University. A University of Kentucky sports fan, Zahn is often seen at games and events.

== Filmography ==
Key
†	Denotes works that have not yet been released

=== Film ===
Year	Title	Role	Notes	Ref.
1992	Rain Without Thunder	Jeremy Tanner		
1994	Reality Bites	Sammy Gray		
1995	Crimson Tide	William Barnes		
1996	Race the Sun	Hans Kooiman		
1996	SubUrbia	Buff		
1996	That Thing You Do!	Lenny Haise		
1997	Subway Stories	Tucker	Segment: "The 5:24"	
1998	The Object of My Affection	Frank Hanson		
1998	Out of Sight	Glenn Michaels		
1998	Safe Men	Eddie		
1998	You've Got Mail	George Pappas		
1999	Forces of Nature	Alan		
1999	Freak Talks About Sex	Freak		
1999	Happy, Texas	Wayne Wayne Wayne Jr., aka David		
1999	Stuart Little	Monty	Voice role	
2000	Chain of Fools	Thomas Kresk		
2000	Hamlet	Rosencrantz		
2001	Chelsea Walls	Ross		
2001	Dr. Dolittle 2	Archie	Voice role	
2001	Joy Ride	Fuller Thomas		
2001	Riding in Cars with Boys	Ray Hasek		
2001	Saving Silverman	Wayne		
2002	Stuart Little 2	Monty	Voice role	
2003	Daddy Day Care	Marvin		
2003	National Security	Hank Rafferty		
2003	Shattered Glass	Adam Penenberg		
2004	Employee of the Month	Jack		
2004	Speak	Mr. Freeman		
2005	Chicken Little	Runt of the Litter	Voice role	
2005	Sahara	Al Giordino		
2006	Bandidas	Quentin Cooke		
2006	Rescue Dawn	Duane		
2008	The Great Buck Howard	Kenny		
2008	Management	Mike Flux		
2008	Strange Wilderness	Peter Gaulke		
2008	Sunshine Cleaning	Mac		
2008	Unstable Fables: 3 Pigs and a Baby	Sandy Pig	Voice, direct-to-video	
2009	Night Train	Pete Dobbs		
2009	A Perfect Getaway	Cliff Anderson		
2010	Calvin Marshall	Coach Little		
2010	Diary of a Wimpy Kid	Frank Heffley		
2010	Salesmen	Marvin		
2011	Diary of a Wimpy Kid: Rodrick Rules	Frank Heffley		
2012	Diary of a Wimpy Kid: Dog Days	Frank Heffley		
2012	Class Clown	Frank Heffley	Voice, short film	
2013	Escape from Planet Earth	Hawk	Voice role	
2013	Dallas Buyers Club	Tucker		
2013	Knights of Badassdom	Eric		
2015	The Good Dinosaur	Thunderclap	Voice role	
2015	The Ridiculous 6	Clem		
2016	Captain Fantastic	Dave		
2017	War for the Planet of the Apes	Bad Ape	Voice and motion-capture	
2017	Lean on Pete	Silver		
2018	Blaze	Oilman #2		
2019	Where'd You Go, Bernadette	David Walker		
2019	Tall Girl	Richie Kreyman		
2020	Uncle Frank	Mike Bledsoe		
2020	Cowboys	Troy		
2021	8-Bit Christmas	John Doyle		
2022	Tall Girl 2	Richie Kreyman		
2022	Night at the Museum: Kahmunrah Rises Again	Jedediah	Voice	
2023	Your Place or Mine	Zen		
2023	LaRoy, Texas	Skip		
2023	Gringa	Jackson		
2023	Wildcat	Tom T. Shiftlet		
2025	She Dances	Jason	Also screenwriter and producer	
2025	Eenie Meanie	Dad Meaney		
2025	Anaconda	Kenny Trent		
TBA	Time Out		Filming	
TBA	Hello & Paris		Filming	

=== Television ===
Year	Title	Role	Notes	Ref.
1990	All My Children	Spence	Episode #5303; Uncredited	
1993	South Beach	Lane Bailey	Episode: "Pirates of the Caribbean"	
1995	Friends	Duncan	Episode: "The One with Phoebe's Husband"	
1995	Mike & Spike	Nick Pickles	Voice, episode: "Person to Clothes"	
1995	Picture Windows	Crook	Episode: "Armed Response"	
1997	Liberty! The American Revolution	American Sergeant	4 episodes	
1998	From the Earth to the Moon	Astronaut Elliot See	Miniseries; Episode: "Can We Do This?"	
2008	Comanche Moon	Augustus "Gus" McCrae	3 episodes	
2008–2012	Phineas and Ferb	Sherman	Voice, 2 episodes	
2009	Monk	Jack Monk, Jr.	Episode: "Mr. Monk's Other Brother"	
2009	WWII in HD	Nolen Marbrey	Voice, 3 episodes	
2010–2013	Treme	Davis McAlary	Regular, 36 episodes	
2013	Randy Cunningham: 9th Grade Ninja	Terry McFist	Voice, episode: "Fart-Topia"	
2014	Mind Games	Clark Edwards	Regular, 13 episodes	
2014–2015	Modern Family	Ronnie La Fontaine	Recurring role, 4 episodes	
2015–2016	Mad Dogs	Cobi	Series regular, 10 episodes	
2018	The Crossing	Jude Ellis	Series lead, 11 episodes	
2019	Valley of the Boom	Michael Fenne	Main role	
2020	The Healing Powers of Dude	Dude	Voice, main role	
2020	The Good Lord Bird	Chase	2 episodes	
2021	The White Lotus	Mark Mossbacher	Main role	
2022	The Last Movie Stars	Donald "Duck" Dobbins	Voice, 3 episodes	
2022–2023	George & Tammy	George Richey	6 episodes	
2023	The Righteous Gemstones	Peter Montgomery	Recurring	
2024–present	Silo	Solo	Main role (season 2–present)	
2025–2026	Chad Powers	Jake Hudson	Main role	

=== Video games ===
Year	Title	Role	Notes
2005	Chicken Little	Runt of the Litter	

== Theatre ==
Year	Title	Role	Notes
1990	Bye Bye Birdie	Hugo Peabody	
1991	Biloxi Blues	Performer	
