= Pink permits =

In 1914, Chicago amended its film censorship ordinance, setting up a category of films approved for showing only to persons over twenty-one (the first example of a rating system in motion-picture exhibition). The police were authorized to give such films "pink permits". According to testimony before the Chicago Motion Picture Commission, the plan took shape following an incident over a film based on Nathaniel Hawthorne's 1850 novel The Scarlet Letter. A delegation of women, having seen the film, requested the police to allow it to be shown. The official in charge replied that he did not know how he could explain to his fifteen-year-old daughter what the scarlet "A" meant, therefore he could not pass the film. Nevertheless, he was troubled, since clearly murder and robbery, the usual censorship taboos, were not at issue. He entered into a "gentleman's agreement" with the film's producer, allowing the film to be shown publicly, provided no one under twenty-one was allowed in. After several similar dilemmas over the films based on literary classics, the "pink permit" policy became law.

== Sources ==
- Hays, Will H., "The Motion Picture Industry," American Review of Reviews, Vol. 67 (January 1923), p. 75.
- Sklar, Robert, Movie-Made America: A Cultural History of American Movies, Random House 1974, 1994 ISBN 0679755497
