= Marty Peretz =

American publisher & editor (born 1938)

- Born: Martin H. Peretz; December 6, 1938 (age 87); New York City, U.S.
- Education: Brandeis University (BA); Harvard University (MA, PhD)
- Occupations: Journalist, publisher
- Known for: The New Republic
- Spouse(s): Linda Heller (m. 1962; div. 196?) Anne Devereux (Labouisse) Farnsworth (m. 1967; div. 2009)
- Children: 2, including Jesse Peretz

Martin H. Peretz (/pəˈrɛts/; born December 6, 1938) is an American former magazine publisher and Harvard University assistant professor. In 1974, he purchased The New Republic and he later assumed editorial control of the magazine. In 1996, Peretz founded the financial news website TheStreet.com with CNBC host and hedge fund manager Jim Cramer.

== Early life and education ==
Peretz grew up in New York City. Both of his parents were Zionists, but not religious Jews. He is a descendant of the Polish-Yiddish writer I. L. Peretz.

Peretz graduated from the Bronx High School of Science at age 15. He received his Bachelor of Arts from Brandeis University in 1959, and a Master of Arts and PhD from Harvard University in Government.

== Career ==
After graduating from Harvard, Peretz was hired as a lecturer in the Committee on Degrees in Social Studies at the university.

=== The New Republic ===
In 1974, Peretz purchased The New Republic from Gilbert A. Harrison for $380,000, which his wife supplied.

After purchasing the magazine, Peretz allowed Harrison, its editor, to continue editing it. Peretz pledged to let him continue running the magazine for at least three years. By 1975, Peretz was agitated by having his own articles rejected for publication, pointing out that he had been pouring more and more money into the magazine to cover its losses, and he fired Harrison. Much of the rest of the staff, including such prominent writers as Walter Pincus, Stanley Karnow, and Doris Grumbach, were fired or quit. They were replaced mainly by recent Harvard graduates lacking journalistic experience. Peretz then named himself the magazine's new editor, serving in that post until 1979.

In the 1980 presidential election, the magazine endorsed the liberal Republican John B. Anderson, running as an independent, rather than the Democratic incumbent, Jimmy Carter. Over time, Peretz purged the magazine of other progressive editors and writers as the magazine underwent a dramatic ideological transformation. As other editors were appointed, Peretz remained editor-in-chief until 2012.

During Peretz's stewardship of The New Republic, the magazine generally maintained liberal and neoliberal positions on economic and social issues while assuming correspondingly pro-Israel and neoconservative hawkish stances on foreign affairs.

Peretz has said, "Support for Israel is, deep down, an expression of America's best view of itself." Alexander Cockburn and Ken Silverstein have said that Peretz said, "I am in love with the State of Israel."

In December 2012, Caroline Glick, a columnist for The Jerusalem Post, praised Peretz for his unshakable loyalty to Israel, writing, "As a man of the Left, he has fought the fight for Israel and Jewish rights, increasingly alone for nearly fifty years, and has done so despite what must have been enormous personal costs as his comrades all jumped ship, and in many cases, joined the cause of Israel's enemies."

Media critic Eric Alterman wrote in The American Prospect of Peretz's tenure as editor of The New Republic that Peretz used the magazine to attack, tarnish, and marginalize people and institutions with which he personally or politically disagreed: "[D]uring his reign, Peretz has also done lasting damage to the cause of American liberalism. By turning TNR into a kind of ideological police dog, Peretz enjoyed... [playing] a key role in defining the borders of 'responsible' liberal discourse, thereby tarring anyone who disagreed as irresponsible or untrustworthy. But he did so on the basis of a politics simultaneously so narrow and idiosyncratic—in thrall almost entirely to an Israel-centric neoconservatism."

During his tenure as owner of The New Republic, Peretz repeatedly used the magazine's editorial pages to attack and marginalize people he perceived as enemies of Israel, among them even many mainstream Israeli politicians and activists. "Sometimes we attack people unfairly", Peretz's friend and TNR literary editor Leon Wieseltier said. Peretz attacked I. F. Stone after Stone signed a public appeal for the provision of water and medical supplies for siege victims trapped in West Beirut during the 1982 Israeli Siege of Beirut, writing, "So this is what I. F. Stone has come to, asking his admirers to put up money so that the PLO can continue to fight." In an April 1991 editorial, as the Gulf War commenced, Peretz wrote that he was "the only writer on the Middle East not invited by PBS or NPR to speak about the Gulf."

In 1997, Peretz fired editor Michael Kelly after Kelly refused to publish an unsigned editorial defending Vice President Al Gore, Peretz's friend and former student, against allegations of improper fundraising. In an interview with The New York Times, Kelly declared that Peretz and Gore's conflict of interest made it "structurally impossible" to work at the magazine.

Peretz has long supported both Democrats and Republicans. As he aged, his support moved from progressives and liberal candidates to neoliberals and conservatives. He was a major behind-the-scenes benefactor of Eugene McCarthy's primary presidential bid in 1968. He supported Senator Barack Obama in both his Democratic primary race and in the 2008 general election, but in 2012 wrote that he hoped that "maybe Barack Obama will be a one-term president" and that a prominent alternative candidate would run against him in the Democratic primary.

Peretz later expressed disappointment with Obama, telling The New York Times Magazine: "I'm not sure I feel betrayed, but it's close... our first African-American president has done less to fight AIDS in Africa than George Bush. He's done nothing on human rights."

Peretz is further known for his support of the 2003 invasion of Iraq. He retained majority ownership of The New Republic until 2002, when he sold a two-thirds stake in the magazine to two financiers. In 2007, Peretz sold the remainder of his ownership rights to CanWest Global Communications, but remained editor-in-chief. In 2009, Peretz repurchased the magazine with a group of investors led by ex-Lazard executive Laurence Grafstein.

In late 2010, Peretz gave up his title of editor-in-chief at The New Republic, becoming instead editor emeritus, and terminated his blog The Spine after other editors and writers at the magazine said they found it offensive and that Peretz would never have had the opportunity to write it if he had not been the magazine's owner. He no longer has any association with the magazine.

In December 2014, journalist Robert Parry wrote, "Though The New Republic still touts its reputation as 'liberal', that label has been essentially a cover for its real agenda: pushing a hawkish foreign policy agenda that included the Reagan administration's slaughter of Central Americans in the 1980s, violent U.S. interventions in Iraq, Syria and other Muslim countries for the past two decades, and Israel's suppression of Palestinians forever."

=== Accusations of bigotry ===
Throughout his career, Peretz has drawn criticism from several of his fellow commentators, particularly Jack Shafer of Slate, James Fallows of The Atlantic, and Eric Alterman of The Nation for making bigoted comments, often directed towards Arabs and Muslims. He has written (among other things) that "'Arab society' is 'hidebound and backward' [and] [t]hat the Druze are 'congenitally untrustworthy'". Noam Chomsky was highly critical of Peretz's coverage of the 1982 Lebanon War in The Fateful Triangle, citing many cases of his bias toward Israel and bigotry against Palestinians and Muslims.

On September 4, 2010, Peretz drew media attention and controversy when he posted an editorial which concluded:

But, frankly, Muslim life is cheap, most notably to Muslims. And among those Muslims led by the Imam Rauf there is hardly one who has raised a fuss about the routine and random bloodshed that defines their brotherhood. So, yes, I wonder whether I need honor these people and pretend that they are worthy of the privileges of the First Amendment which I have in my gut the sense that they will abuse.

In September 2010, Nicholas Kristof, a columnist for The New York Times, denounced Peretz's comments, asking: "Is it possible to imagine the same kind of casual slur tossed off about blacks or Jews?"

Peretz issued an apology on September 13. In his statement about Muslims and the First Amendment, Peretz said: "I wrote that, but I do not believe that. I do not think that any group or class of persons in the United States should be denied the protections of the First Amendment, not now, not ever." Peretz also said that his comment that "Muslim life is cheap, most notably to Muslims" was "a statement of fact, not of value" and pointed out that Kristof himself agreed that Muslims have not adequately condemned violence perpetrated by Muslims on fellow Muslims.

Kristof responded by criticizing Peretz for falsely claiming that Kristof agreed with him, and also for continuing to generalize that all Muslims had the attitude of Muslim terrorists toward human life:

Making generalizations about racial, ethnic or religious groups is a dangerous game. Many Muslims see Americans dropping bombs in Iraq or Afghanistan and think that Christians don't value human life. Arabs see Israelis invading Gaza and insist that Jews don't value human life. Islam is no more monolithic than Christianity or Judaism, and these kinds of sweeping generalizations have historically led to dehumanizing other groups in ways that lead to discrimination and violence. They're invidious and dangerous whether it's we or Afghans who fall for them.

On September 17, 2010, Peretz issued yet another apology:

... [I]n this past year I have publicly committed the sin of wild and wounding language, especially hurtful to our Muslim brothers and sisters. I do not console myself that many other Americans at this moment are committing the same transgressions, against others. I allowed emotion to run way ahead of reason, and feelings to trample arguments. For this I am sorry.

On September 20, 2010, five major Harvard University student organizations, citing Peretz's long "history of making terribly racist statements", urged Harvard not to go ahead with honors planned for Peretz. The organizations—the Harvard Islamic Society, Latinas Unidas, and the Harvard Black Students Association—asserted that Peretz, over more than a decade, had not only made racist comments against Muslims but also regarding African Americans and Mexicans.

Following the controversy, Harvard University canceled Peretz's scheduled September 25 speech on the 50th anniversary of Harvard's Social Studies Department where Peretz once taught.

The Atlantic's James Fallows summarized Peretz's reputation, concluding that if his legacy were settled that day, despite being "beloved by many students and respected by some magazine colleagues", he would be considered a bigot. Fallows also wrote: "Martin Peretz has been undeniably shamed. And lastingly shamed."

Marc Tracy wrote in the Jewish magazine Tablet:

[I]f you will—this is not the first time he has written something racist, and it isn't the fifteenth time, either... But the tonnage of these quotations and the consistency of their content demonstrate that Peretz's insensitivity and bigotry toward Muslims and Arabs (er, and black people) yank him out of the realm of people you should be reading on the subject.

Jefferson Morley, a Peretz friend who worked at The New Republic from 1983 to 1987, told Jack Shafer of Slate, "I could never reconcile this intellectual strength with his racism and unpleasant attempts to play the bully."

=== Jeffrey Epstein ===
In February 2026, the DOJ release of the Epstein files revealed that in 2010 Peretz solicited a $50,000 donation to YIVO from Jeffrey Epstein.

== In popular culture ==
In the 1993 novel Blue Hearts, set in Washington D.C., PBS news anchor Jim Lehrer included Peretz as the roman à clef character "Jonathan Perry". Lehrer wrote of the fictional Perry:

He was a lightweight sociology professor of no special talent or accomplishment who owned and edited the magazine The New World because his wife was a shoe company heiress who bought it for him. He was a joke in all circles except those that believed money was important...[he] had made himself even more foolish by writing a recent column accusing the producers of...public television and radio, of blacklisting him for his strong pro-Israel views. It was an embarrassing incoherence that only the owner of a publication could have brought to public print.

The incident described in the novel apparently derived from real life. Press critic Jack Shafer noted that Peretz, in a column titled "Blacklisted", described having "leaned on NPR News Veep Bill Buzenberg for just a little mike (to no avail) and that he told PBS's Jim Lehrer he wouldn't turn down a date on The MacNeil/Lehrer NewsHour, either." Lehrer was said to have never offered Peretz an invitation to appear on the show.

Peretz is portrayed in Stephen Glass's 2003 novel The Fabulist and by Ted Kotcheff in the 2003 film Shattered Glass, based on the Glass controversy.

== Personal life ==
Peretz was married briefly in his twenties to Linda Heller, the daughter of prominent citrus growers who lived on Fifth Avenue and in Miami Beach, Florida. The couple met in Boston. The ceremony took place at the Plaza Hotel in 1962. They separated shortly thereafter.

From 1967 to 2009, Peretz was married to Anne Devereux (Labouisse) Farnsworth Peretz, daughter of Henry Richardson Labouisse, Jr. and an heir to the Singer Sewing Machine Company fortune. They helped finance Ramparts magazine in the 1960s until it published articles critical of Israel's governmental policies, which led Peretz and his wife to withdraw their support.

In 2009, the couple divorced. Peretz's wife cited multiple infidelities and his "explosive temper" as problems in the marriage.

In his 2023 memoir, Peretz wrote for the first time that he is gay, confirming longstanding rumors.

Peretz is the father of Jesse Peretz, a director, and Evgenia Peretz, a writer. He is a longtime friend, former teacher, and political supporter of former Vice President Al Gore.

== Honors and awards ==
Peretz has seven honorary doctorates: the honorary degree of Doctor of Laws from Bard College (1982), Coe College (1983), Long Island University (1988), Brandeis University (1989), Hebrew College (1990), Chicago Theological Seminary (1994), and the degree of Doctor of Philosophy honoris causa from the Hebrew University of Jerusalem (1987)."

In 1993, Harvard inaugurated the Martin Peretz Chair in Yiddish Literature in his honor. The Chair is currently held by Ruth Wisse.

Peretz has been a member of the Washington Institute for Near East Policy's Board of Advisors.
