= Julie Hilden =

American writer and lawyer

- Born: Julie Cope Hilden; April 19, 1968; Teaneck, New Jersey, U.S.
- Died: March 17, 2018 (aged 49); Venice, California, U.S.
- Education: Harvard College (BA); Yale University (JD); Cornell University (MFA)
- Occupations: Novelist; lawyer
- Spouse: Stephen Glass (m. 2014)

Julie Cope Hilden (April 19, 1968 – March 17, 2018) was an American novelist and lawyer.

== Biography ==
Hilden grew up in Hawaii and New Jersey. She graduated with a B.A. in philosophy from Harvard College, a J.D. from Yale Law School, and an M.F.A. from Cornell University. Upon graduating from law school, she clerked for then-Chief Judge Stephen G. Breyer of the U.S. Court of Appeals for the First Circuit, and for Judge Kimba M. Wood of the U.S. District Court for the Southern District of New York. She was admitted to the New York and District of Columbia bars. She was a litigation associate at the law firm of Williams & Connolly in Washington, D.C., from 1996 to 1999. She worked on First Amendment, criminal defense, appellate cases, and other issues. As a legal writer her commentaries can be found on her webpage at Justia's Verdict. She was a legal commentator on Good Morning America, Court TV, CNN, and NPR, and local television and radio stations. She lived for several years with her husband, former journalist Stephen Glass. Hilden died at the age of 49 due to complications from early-onset Alzheimer's disease, the same illness from which her mother had suffered.

== Bibliography ==
The Bad Daughter, a memoir, is Julie Hilden’s first book. Her second book and first novel, 3, was published by Plume in August 2003. Actes Sud Publishing translated it for the French market, Bantam Books released it in the UK, and it received a Czech translation. 3 was optioned for a film adaptation; Hilden was reportedly writing the first draft of the screenplay.
