= Ryan Jacobs =

American writer and magazine editor

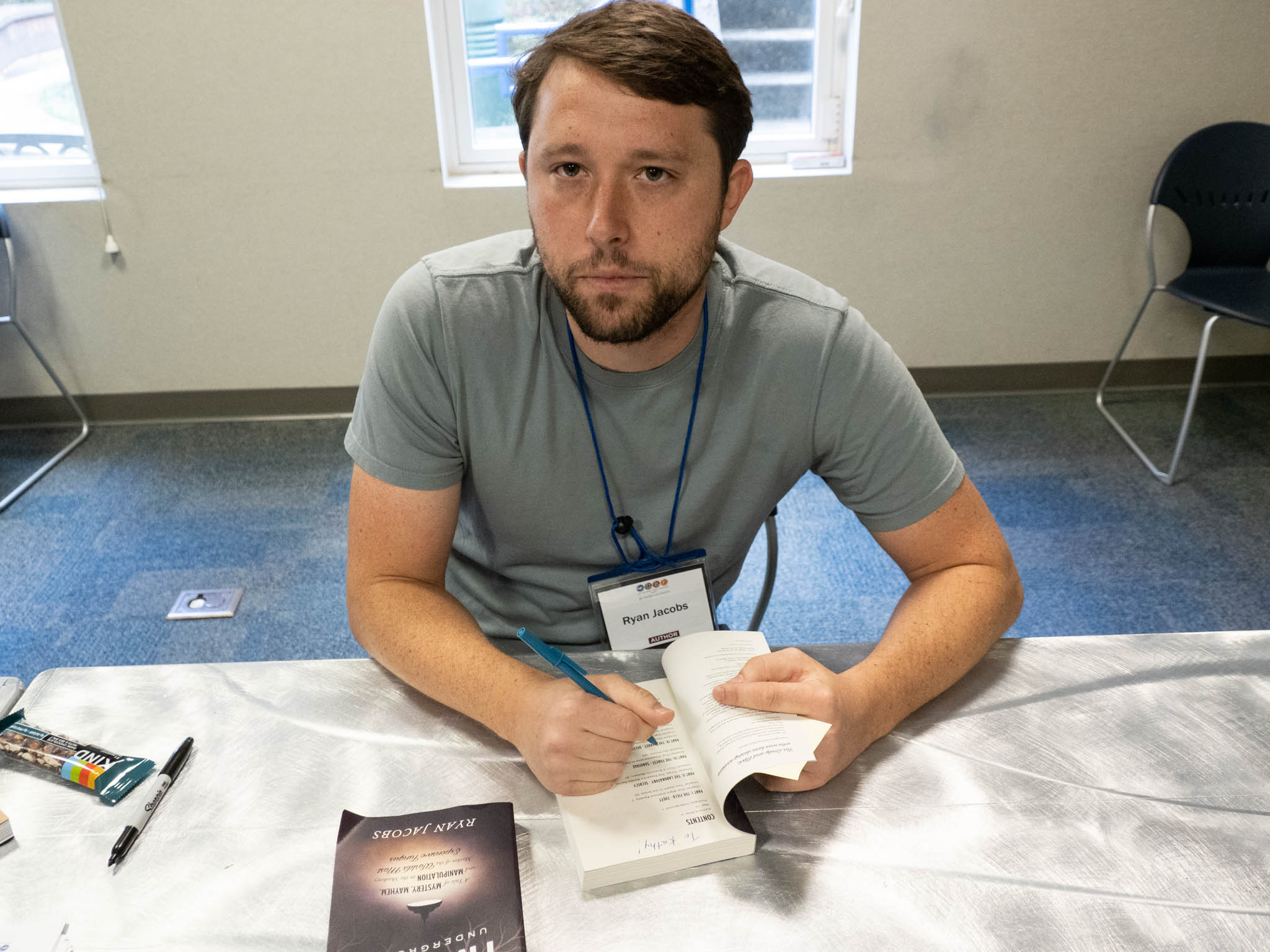
- Ryan Jacobs, August 2019
- Born: Los Angeles, California, U.S.
- Education: Northwestern University
- Occupations: Writer, author, magazine editor

Ryan Jacobs (born 1989) is an American writer, and magazine editor. He is best known for his reporting in The Atlantic, his editing at Pacific Standard, and his critically acclaimed first book, The Truffle Underground.

== Early life ==
Jacobs was born in Los Angeles and graduated from Loyola High School, where he worked as an editor on the student newspaper, The Loyalist. He matriculated to Northwestern University's Medill School of Journalism, where he studied magazine journalism.

== Career ==
After graduating summa cum laude from Northwestern University's Medill School of Journalism, Jacobs began his career as a reporter at a small Pulitzer Prize-winning weekly, the Point Reyes Light, in Marin County, California. His stint there led to stops at a number of San Francisco-based publications, including Sierra magazine, the short-lived Bay Citizen, and Mother Jones, where he worked closely with fellow Medill alum Clara Jeffrey.

After Mother Jones, he joined The Atlantic's global channel, where he covered international crime and other foreign affairs from Washington, D.C., under Olga Khazan and J.J. Gould. His reporting for The Atlantic was cited and featured by the New York Times, Esquire, Canadian Broadcasting Corporation's 'Q' radio program, and author Naomi Klein. He departed for an editing position at Pacific Standard.

In his first year at Pacific Standard, Jacobs oversaw the Quick Studies section of the magazine's website, which won a Folio magazine Eddie award. After two years as an associate and senior editor overseeing digital expansion, he was appointed deputy editor, second-in-command to editor-in-chief, Nicholas Jackson. Together, they reorganized the editorial team and redesigned the magazine, leading it to a National Magazine Award in 2017. During Jacobs' tenure at Pacific Standard, stories he has edited have won a Mirror Award, helped launch major books, influenced network television, and received mention in the Best American Essays anthology. He continued to work as deputy editor from the magazine's headquarters in Santa Barbara until its closure in 2019.

== Book ==
His first book, The Truffle Underground, edited by Francis Lam and published by the Clarkson Potter imprint of Penguin Random House in June 2019, focuses on crime in the international truffle trade. BuzzFeed listed the book as one of the most anticipated titles of the year. It was named a best book of the summer by Outside magazine and a non-fiction "page-turner" by Fortune magazine.

Jacobs and the book also received coverage and reviews in Publishers Weekly, Kirkus, Booklist, Thrillist, NPR's Marketplace, WNYC's "All of It With Alison Stewart," the New York Times, the New York Post, Eater, the San Francisco Chronicle, BookPage, Crime Reads, and the Chicago Review of Books, among others.
