= Deborah Hutchison =

American entrepreneur, author, film producer, and public speaker

Deborah Hutchison (born Deborah Bunn, formerly Rosen) is an American entrepreneur, author, filmmaker, who also served over 20 years on the board and 5 years on the executive board of Trustees at William Woods University. Hutchison holds a Bachelor of Arts in English and Secondary Education.

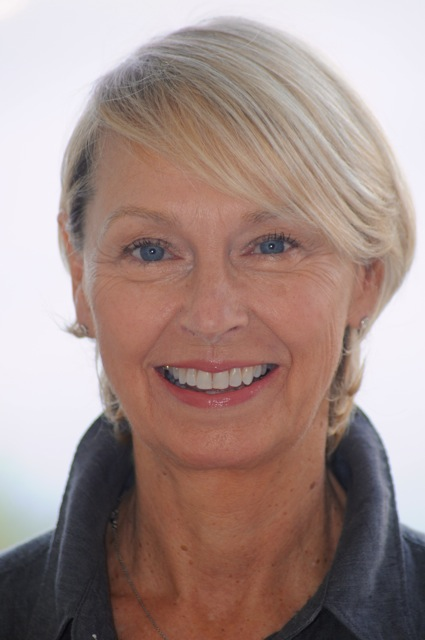
Deborah Hutchison

== Film and media career ==
Hutchison has co-founded several companies and worked with numerous film studios, as an atmosphere casting director and/or assistant director, including Columbia Pictures, Warner Brothers, Universal Pictures, MGM Studios, Orion Pictures, and Paramount Pictures on one or more of their various films. In 1979, while working as an extra in The Blues Brothers, she saw an opportunity to form her own casting company for extras in Chicago. In 1980, she cast three days worth of extras for the feature film, Thief, starring James Caan and went on to found Rosen-Knutsen Casting in Chicago, where she worked as the founding partner for five years.

Hutchison's company was responsible for casting for extras on numerous films, including Streets of Fire, Class, Doctor Detroit, Lucas, Grandview, USA and Code of Silence. She also served as Production Assistant on many of these films. In 1984 Hutchison was voted into the Directors Guild of America. In 1985, she worked as 2nd assistant director on Weird Science and the TV pilot of Lady Blue. Hutchison sold the company the same year to her partner, Susan Knutsen, and moved to Los Angeles, where she quickly established a new production company, Rosen-Caplan. She worked with ABC as the associate producer of movie of the week, Bluffing It and with developing the in-house pilot, Night School. During this time, Hutchison simultaneously co-founded Panther Productions Inc. with husband Hall Hutchison and worked on such TV projects as, Liquid Television, Jay Jay the Jet Plane, and Pee-Wee's Playhouse. In 2008, Hutchison began work on the animated short film The Improbable Journey of Berta Benz which was released in 2012 and won numerous awards.The Berta Benz project led Hutchison to her next venture, Gutsy Gals Inspire Me, a multimedia entertainment company that encourages women to live with clarity and courage and "drive their destiny" by pursuing their dreams.The company also had a strong philanthropic focus, presenting Gutsy Gals Inspire Me Awards from 2008 to 2020 to honor women who exemplified courage, vision, and perseverance in achieving their goals.

== Creative products ==
Hutchison created a do-it-yourself billing system, "Bill Your Ex," designed for handling financial issues following a divorce and, in 1990, was awarded a Lammie award for Best New Product Marketing in a Law Related Field from California Lawyer magazine. Her "Bill Your Ex" kit included a year's supply of invoices, sample covering letters, envelopes, and a ledger for keeping track of it all.

In 1996, with producer Marla McNally Philips, Hutchison launched "Survival Tactics to Unbreak Your Heart," a product designed to help women heal from broken hearts by making them smile. The kit included a voodoo doll, tips for revenge, and a "Guide to Getting Even... Better" with 100 places to meet a new prince. Both Sarah, Duchess of York and Princess Stéphanie of Monaco offered letters of support for Survival Tactics.

In 2009, Sterling Publishing, a division of Barnes & Noble, released her self-help book Put It In Writing! Creating Agreements Between Family and Friends, which was co-written by the star of FOX's Divorce Court Judge Lynn Toler. She and Toler sell a variety of family and friend agreements online addressing situations like caring for aging parents, lending money, and adult children returning home to live. In addition, Hutchison has created a line of original merchandise sold through Gutsy Gals Inspire Me including note cards, posters, and apparel accessories to further the "gutsy" message.

== Public speaking ==
Since 2009, Hutchison has been a featured speaker at the International Women's Festivals, a yearly empowerment and networking conference held in Santa Barbara, CA. At these conferences, she has distributed a number of “Gutsy Gal awards” to leading individuals, such as philanthropist and publisher, Sara Miller-McCune, former model and entrepreneur, Kathy Ireland, actress, model, and advocate Kelly Le Brock, as well as humanitarians, Deepa Willingham and Razia Jan. She has presented at both William Woods University in Fulton, MO and Westmont College in Montecito, CA. Her presentations focus on empowering girls and women to be "gutsy" by using positive female role models as examples; out of the box thinking and the creation of niche businesses; and clarity, commitment, and courage when addressing emotional situations.

== Awards and accolades ==
- 1990 Lammie Award for Best New Product in A Law-Related Field (Bill Your Ex System) from California Lawyer Magazine
- 1999 Distinguished Alumna Award from William Woods University
- 2008 Annual Women of Achievement Award from the Association of Women in Communication (Santa Barbara Chapter)
- 2011 Outstanding Service Award from William Woods University Alumni Association
- 2013 Breaking Traditions Award for The Improbable Journey of Berta Benz from the Career Technical Education Equity Council|2012 Myra P. Sadker Award for The Improbable Journey of Berta Benz from the Career Technical Education Equity Council
- 2013 Breaking Traditions Award for The Improbable Journey of Berta Benz from the Career Technical Education Equity Council|2013 Breaking Traditions Award for The Improbable Journey of Berta Benz from the Career Technical Education Equity Council
- 2013 Best Animated Short from L.A. Women's International Film Festival for The Improbable Journey of Berta Benz
