= Nicholas Jackson (editor) =

American author

- Born: May 9, 1987 (age 39) Waukegan, Illinois
- Occupation: Editor, writer
- Education: Illinois Mathematics and Science Academy, Northwestern University

Nicholas Jackson (born 1987) is an American author, writer, and magazine editor known for his work at The Atlantic, Outside, Atlas Obscura, and Pacific Standard, where he served as the magazine's third editor-in-chief from 2015 until its closure in 2019. He has since worked as an independent consultant, media strategist, and director of editorial for a variety of publishers, organizations, and tech start-ups.

== Education ==
Jackson is a graduate of The Illinois Mathematics & Science Academy, a three-year residential high school in Aurora, Illinois, founded by Leon Lederman, where he was the 2005 commencement speaker and an editor on The Acronym, the independent, student-run newspaper. In 2009, he graduated from Northwestern University's Medill School of Journalism, Media, Integrated Marketing Communications with a bachelor's degree in journalism. Eight years later, he was profiled in Medill's alumni magazine as an editor focused on accountability journalism in the public interest and "ambitious narrative and investigative reporting."

== Career ==
After graduating from Northwestern University, Jackson began his career as a reporter at Slate before joining The Atlantic in 2010 as an editor to oversee tech coverage with Alexis Madrigal and veteran correspondent James Fallows. Their approach was described as going "beyond writing about the big companies and the coolest gadgets to show how new tools and ideas are influencing the world." The following year, he launched The Atlantic's health coverage, working closely with J.J. Gould and Bob Cohn. While at The Atlantic, his work was cited by Wired, CNN, NBC News, and others.

In 2012, Jackson became digital editorial director at Outside. There, he was named to Folio:'s 30 under 30 list for overseeing "100 percent growth in page views" over six months. He would be named to Folio:'s 30 under 30 list again in 2017, with editors writing that, "with limited resources, Jackson has made Pacific Standard a must-read for those interested in working toward forward-looking solutions to social and environmental problems."

He had joined Pacific Standard in 2013. After two years as the digital director and associate publisher overseeing business development and online audience growth, Jackson was appointed the magazine's third editor-in-chief. During his tenure as editor, the magazine earned numerous awards and industry accolades, including journalism's highest honor, the National Magazine Award. It also earned a Silver Medal for Feature Design from the Society of Publication Designers; a Mirror Award for Best Profile from the S.I. Newhouse School of Public Communications at Syracuse University for "Editor in Exile," a look at authoritarian rule in the Maldives; and several arts and entertainment awards from the Los Angeles Press Club. In addition, the magazine was recognized by the National Association of Science Writers for best long-form writing and reporting, and the Society of Environmental Journalists for its investigative environmental journalism. Works that first appeared in Pacific Standard have been featured in multiple anthologies, including Best American Essays, Best American Science & Nature Writing, Best Food Writing, Best American Sports Writing, and What Future: The Year’s Best Ideas to Reclaim, Reanimate & Reinvent Our Future.

In 2017, Jackson won the National Magazine Award from the American Society of Magazine Editors in the Feature Photography category for "Adrift," a series on Eritrean refugees photographed from on board a Doctors Without Borders ship in the Mediterranean. In the award citation, the ASME judges wrote that, "sensitively paced and complemented by elegant typography, Francesco Zizola's photographs of migrants attempting to cross the Mediterranean combine a strong visual perspective with a powerful narrative voice." Jackson was a finalist two years later, in 2019, for the National Magazine Award in Essays and Criticism for Terese Marie Mailhot's story about surviving racism as a Native writer, "Silence Breaking Woman."

At Pacific Standard, he argued for radical transparency around editorial decisions in newsrooms and promoted the importance of strong relationships with freelance writers, leading the magazine to be named one of the best places to pitch story ideas. As editor-in-chief, he was also publicly celebrated for "cultivating stories that inform and change people's lives."

When the magazine closed, it was written that Jackson "led a superb editorial team over his six years there" and that Pacific Standard "stood out from the pack of click-hungry websites." Lloyd Grove, of The Daily Beast, reported that the shutdown "hit the journalism community especially hard," with other journalists noting that "I've looked to Pacific Standard so many times for examples of great, clear-eyed reporting and elegant (but never over-the-top) writing" and that "Pacific Standard was the best dedicated source for social science coverage anywhere, and routinely put out stories that made me burn with jealousy that I didn't think of them first or do them as well. The world will be worse without it."
