= Iya Kiva =

Iya Kiva Ія Ківа
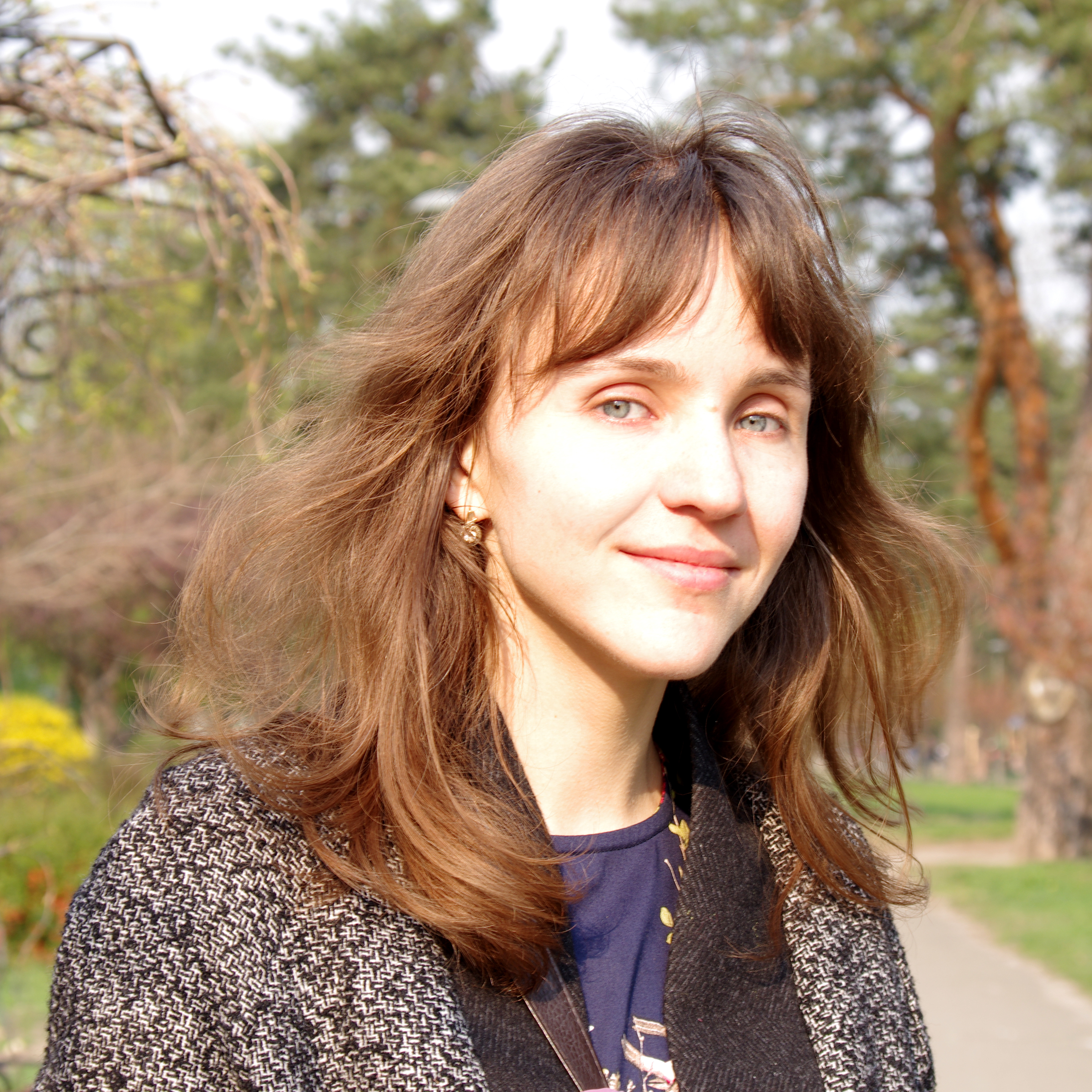
- Born: May 4, 1984 (age 42); Donetsk, Ukraine
- Education: Donetsk National University
- Occupations: poet; translator; journalist; critic

Iya Kiva (another spelling - Ija Kiva) (Ukrainian: Ія Ківа; born May 4, 1984) is a Ukrainian poet, translator, journalist, and critic. She is the author of the books, Подальше от рая (Further from Heaven), Перша сторінка зими (The First Page of Winter), and Ми прокинемось іншими: розмови з сучасними білоруськими письменниками про минуле, теперішнє і майбутнє Білорусі (We Will Wake Up to Others: Conversations with Contemporary Belarusian Writers on the Past, Present and Future of Belarus). She is a member of PEN Ukraine. Kiva writes in Ukrainian and Russian.

== Early life and education ==
Iya Yanivna Kiva was born on May 4, 1984, in the city of Donetsk. She graduated from the Faculty of Philology of Donetsk National University, majoring in Russian Language, Literature, and Culturology. She also studied graphic design. Due to the Russo-Ukrainian war, in the summer of 2014, she moved to Kyiv.

== Career ==
Kiva began writing in Ukrainian at the beginning of the war in 2014. These included poems, translations and reviews, published in domestic and foreign periodicals, as well as in anthologies such as, Антологія молодої української поезії III тисячоліття (Anthology of young Ukrainian poetry of the third millennium). She is the author of the poetry collections Подальше от рая (Further from Heaven; 2018) and Перша сторінка зими (The First Page of Winter; 2019). Her poems have been translated into 33 languages, including English.

She is the winner of a number of international and Ukrainian festivals and competitions, including the International Poetry Festival "Emigrant Lyre" (2016) and the International Poetry Competition "Gaivoronnya" (2019). Kiva is a laureate of the award named after Yuri Kaplan (2013), the literary competition of the Smoloskyp publishing house (2018, 4th prize), the Metaphora translation prize (2018), and others. She is the winner of the II Poetry Tournament and the Nestor the Chronicler Prize (2019), as well as Metaphora Translation Prize (2020).

The book Подальше от рая (Further from Heaven) was included in the list of the best books of 2018 according to PEN Ukraine. The poetry collection, Перша сторінка зими (The First Page of Winter), received a special award from the jury of the "ЛітАкцент-2019" (LitAccent-2019) award, and was included in the list of the best books of 2019 according to PEN Ukraine. The book, Ми прокинемось іншими (We will wake up to others), was included in the list of important non-fiction books according to The Village Ukraine, and the list of the best books of 2021 according to the Ukrainian PEN.

She has participated in poetry events, as well as national and international festivals in Ukraine, Belarus, Poland, Belgium, Finland, the USA, Germany, Estonia, Latvia, Greece, Italy, Georgia, Austria, Switzerland, Bulgaria, Hungary, Croatia, Denmark, Romania, Moldova, Lithuania. She is a scholar of the program of the Minister of Culture of Poland Gaude Polonia (2021), and participant in the literary residence "Гніздо" (The Nest Residency) in the village of Vytachiv, Kyiv Oblast (2022). As a translator, Kiva participated in international translation seminars "Cities of translators digital", a draft program of the German Translation Foundation "TOLEDO" with the support of the German Ministry of Foreign Affairs (online, 2020) and "Tłumacze bez granic" (Translators without Borders; 2021, Wojnowice, Poland).

== Selected works ==
=== Poetry ===
- Further from Heaven, 2018 (in Russian and Ukrainian)
- The First Page of Winter, 2019 (in Ukrainian)
- A witness to namelessness, 2022 (Bulgarian: translated by Denis Olegov)
- Black roses of time, 2022 (Polish: translated by Aneta Kaminska)
- The laughter of an extinguished fire, 2023 (in Ukrainian)
- Ія Ківа. Осиротілі дерева / Ija Kiwa. Osierocone drzewa / Iya Kiva. The Orphaned Trees. — Krakow, Krakowskie Biuro Festywalowe; Versopolis, 2024. — 54 p. (na polski przełożyła Aneta Kaminska; translators into English – Philip Nikolayev and Yevgeniya Kanyshcheva)
- Iya Kiva. La guerra è sempre seduta su tutte le sedie / Traduzione e note critiche di Yuliia Chernyshova e Pina Piccolo. — Milano, La Vita Felice, 2024. — 136 p. (in Italian and Ukrainian)
- Ija Kiva. Tidens nya alfabet / I översättning av Mikael Nydahl & Diana Dobrodij. — Lund, Ariel & Ellerströms, 2024. — 56 s. (in Swedish)
- Ija Kiva. 9 dikter. / Översättning till svenska av Mikael Nydahl & Diana Dobrodij; Översättning till engelska Kathering E. Young, Amelia Glaser, Yulia Ilchuk, Yevgeniya Kanyshcheva och Philip Nikolayev. – Umea, Text & Kultur, 2025. — 32 pp.; in Sweden, Ukrainian and English)
- Silence Dressed in Cyrillic Letters, 2026 (Ukrainian and English: translated by Amelia Glaser and Yuliya Ilchuk)

=== Anthologies ===
- Breed. Anthology of Ukrainian writers of Donbass, 2017
- Ukrainian Nadzieja. Anthology of poetry, 2017
- Anthology of young Ukrainian poetry of the third millennium, 2018
- Poetic subway, 2020
- Anthology of young Ukrainian poetry "ROMAN. K 30+ ", 2021
- Reading of the young city, 2021
- Invasion: Ukrainian Poems about the War. /Trans. from Ukrainian by Anatoly Kudryavitsky. - Dublin, Ireland: Survision Books. - 2022.
- Under Ukrainas öppna himmel. Röster ur ett krig: En litterär antologi./Red. Mikael Nydahl, Kholod Saghir. — Linderöd: Ariel förlag; Svenska PEN, 2022. — 288 sidor (in Swedish translations)
- Voices of Freedom: Contemporary Writing From Ukraine. — Winston-Salem, USA: 8th & Atlas Publishing, 2022.
- TMINTIS UGNIS DEGUONIS. Iš mūsų laiko Ukrainos poezijos / Vertė Antanas A. Jonynas. — Vilnius, leidykla «Odilė», 2022. — 224 p. (in Lithuanian translations by Antanas Jonynas)
- Ukrajina 2022: pjesnički ljetopis rata / Pripremila i prevela Alla Tatarenko (in Croatian translations by Alla Tatarenko)
- PEN România la centenar. Fotografie de război / Edited by Radu Vancu. — Сasa de pariuri literare, 2022. — 220 p. (in Romanian)
- In the Hour of War: Poems from Ukraine / Edited by Carolyn Forché and Ilya Kaminsky. — Arrowsmith Press, 2023. — 114 p. (in translations by Amelia Glaser and Yuliya Ilchuk)
- RĂZBOIUL MI-A LUAT TOT. Scriitori ucraineni față în față cu războiul / Antologator: Dumitru Crudu. — Chişinău, Editura Prut International, 2023. — 114 p.
- Wojna 2022: eseje, wiersze, dzienniki / Antologia. — Warszawa, Centrum Mieroszewskiego, Nowa Polszcza, 2023. — 424 p. (in Polish translations by Aneta Kaminska)
- DEN KRIEG ÜBERSETZEN: Gedichte aus der Ukraine / Hrsg.: Claudia Dathe, Tanja Rodinova, Asmus Trautsch. — Berlin, edition.fotoTAPETA, 2024. (in German translations by Claudia Dathe, Ulrike Almut Sandig and Beatrix Kersten)
- Hét nyelven beszélünk | We Speak the Same Language: Gérard Cartier, Guy Helminger, Ija Kiva, Jaan Malin, Yvonne Reddick, Antonio Rivero Taravillo. — Budapest, Labirintus, 2024. — 160 oldal [44] (Translators: L'Atelier, Imreh András, Lengyel Tóth Krisztina, Lázár Júlia, Schein Gábor, Vonnák Diána)

=== Translations ===
- Elizabeth Suneby and Laurel Molk, No Room for a Pup!, 2022
- Rita Golden Gelman, Queen Esther Saves Her People, 2021
- Blessed Benjamin in translations, 2021
- Blessed Benjamin. The light of travel and separation. 2021 (co-translator with Yulia Sheket and Natalia Belchenko)
- Dmitry Strotsev, Belarus overturned, 2021
- Yael Molchadsky, Shopkeeper and baker, 2021
- Pamela Mayer, Don't Sneeze at the Wedding, 2020
- Eric A. Kimmel, Gershon's Monster, 2020
- Gloria Koster, Ruthie is Little Red Riding Hood, 2019
- Lesik Panasyuk, Screams of hands. Poems., 2018
- Maria Galina, Indigenous, 2016

=== Journalism ===
- We will wake up different: conversations with contemporary Belarusian writers about the past, present and future of Belarus, 2021

=== Essays ===
- What will give us strength? Essays of Ukrainian intellectuals on the focus of the Ukrainian PEN 2019/2020, 2021
- Iya Kiva. The Defense of Humanity // Krytyka magazine, November 2023.
- Iya Kiva. Future Perfect // The dreaming machine, № 13.
- Iya Kiva. Further From Peace, Closer to Victory // Online anthology "State of War" (Meridian Czernowitz, 2022).
