= Gutsy Gals Inspire Me =

- Industry: Entertainment; Education
- Founded: Santa Barbara, California (2008)
- Headquarters: West Palm Beach, Florida, United States
- Key people: Deborah Hutchison (Founder & CEO); Christina Holbrook, COO/VP Sales & Marketing; Helen Arnold, CAO; Maria Lopez, Social Media Director; Brenna Osborn, Designer
- Website: www.gutsygalsinspireme.com

Gutsy Gals Inspire Me (GGIM) was created by Deborah Hutchison in 2008 to inspire girls and women to be courageous, clear, confident, and to "drive their destinies" by pursuing their dreams. The company works toward this by recognizing and promoting inspirational female role models and their stories through award programs, conference panels, “Hollywood style” animated educational films and teaching/activity guides, a line of GGIM note cards, and other merchandise including family and friend agreements.

== Gutsy Gal Awards ==
GGIM recognizes and honors courageous and visionary girls/women by awarding them with an original “Gutsy Gal” Award. To date, awards have been distributed at women's conferences, Girls Inc., and to individuals privately. Awards are scheduled to be delivered at the upcoming Berkshire Women's Writers Festival and Palm Beach International Film Gala.

In 2009, the first Gutsy Gal Award was presented to a group of young girls from the Santa Barbara Chapter of Girls, Inc. The first women's award was presented to visionary publisher and philanthropist, Sara Miller-McCune, at the 2010 International Women's Festivals in Santa Barbara, CA. Additional award recipients at the Women's Festivals have included:

- media consultant, entrepreneur and women's advocate, Mary Schnack (2011)
- business woman and entrepreneur, Kathy Ireland (2012)
- artist and consultant, Judi Weisbart, and speaker, Laurie Polich-Short (2013)
- model, actress and children's advocate Kelly Le Brock (2014)
- humanitarians Deepa Willingham, Lee Langley, and Razia Jan (2014)

To draw attention to female film writers and directors, GGIM is presenting the first Gutsy Gal Filmmaker Award at the Berkshire Festival of Women Writers in March, 2015 at Bard College at Simon's Rock.

== Films ==
The Improbable Journey of Berta Benz is a 15-minute, independently produced, animated short film about Berta Benz, wife of Karl Benz (founder of Mercedes-Benz), and her remarkable journey in 1888. Accompanying the film is a 48-page teaching guide filled with fun and educational activities based on the STEM curriculum. It is the first in a series of GGIM produced films.

In 2013, the film won "Best of Fest" for an animation short from the Los Angeles Women's International Film Festival, as well as the Myra P. Sadker and Breaking Traditions awards from the Career and Technical Education Equity Council (CTEEC).

== Family and Friend Agreements ==
In 2009, Sterling Publishing, a division of Barnes & Noble released founder, Deborah Hutchison's, self-help book Put It In Writing! Creating Agreements Between Family and Friends, which was co-written by the star of FOX's Divorce Court, Judge Lynn Toler. The book offers family and friend agreements that address potentially contentious situations like adult children moving back home, caring for aging parents, relationships, lending money, amongst others. In 2010, through GGIM and sister company, A Sane Approach to an Emotional Issue, the family and friend agreements were made available for purchase online.

== Merchandise ==
GGIM has created a line of merchandise including note cards, posters, and apparel accessories to further the "gutsy" message.
