= John E. Hatley =

Former U.S. Army First Sergeant

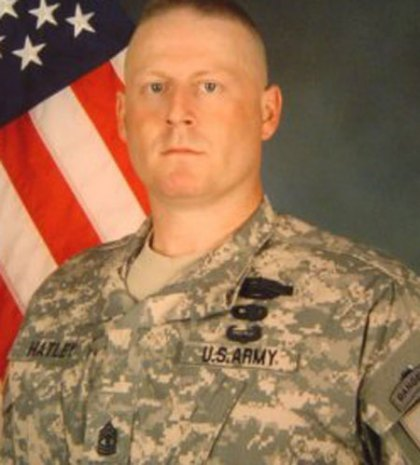
- Born: July 30, 1968 (age 58); Decatur, Texas, U.S.
- Education: Upper Iowa University
- Occupation: Soldier
- Employer: U.S. Army
- Known for: War crimes
- Status: Paroled
- Allegiance: United States of America
- Convictions: Premeditated murder (4 counts); Conspiracy to commit premeditated murder
- Penalty: Life imprisonment; commuted to 40 years imprisonment

Details
- Date: March 2007
- Country: Iraq
- Location: Al-Rashid, Baghdad
- Killed: 4
- Date apprehended: February 2008

John E. Hatley (born July 30, 1968) is a former first sergeant who was prosecuted by the United States Army in 2008 for murdering four Iraqi detainees near Baghdad, Iraq in 2006. He was convicted in 2009 and sentenced to life in prison at the Fort Leavenworth Disciplinary Barracks. He was released on parole in October 2020. Hatley is colloquially associated with a group of US military personnel convicted of war crimes known as the Leavenworth 10.

== Early life and education ==
Hatley was born in Decatur, Texas, in 1968 to Darryl and Ann Hatley. One of five children, Hatley dropped out of Groesbeck High School and joined the United States Army, graduating basic training at Fort Benning in December 1989. He later earned his GED and attended the University of Maryland while on active duty.

== Military career ==
After basic training, Hatley was assigned to the Army's 101st Airborne Division and deployed to Operations Desert Shield and Desert Storm. In 1999, Hatley deployed with the 5th Cavalry Regiment to Operation Joint Forge in Bosnia and Herzegovina. In 2001, Hatley again deployed to the Balkans, this time as part of Operation Joint Guardian II in Kosovo. The first of Hatley's two deployments to Iraq came in 2004, where he worked in the 1st Infantry Division's operations section. His second deployment was as the first sergeant of Alpha Company of the 1st Battalion of the 18th Infantry Regiment.

=== 2006 Deployment and murder allegations ===
Hatley and his unit were on patrol in the al Rashid district of Baghdad when they came under small-arms fire. They moved in to counterattack the building and captured four Shi'ite fighters (later associated with the Mahdi Army) attempting to flee. The detainees were taken back to the unit's staging area, when the unit received word from their chain of command that the four men were likely to be released due to insufficient evidence. According to the allegations, Hatley and two other senior noncommissioned officers took the four men to a remote location, handcuffed and blindfolded them, and placed them on their knees before shooting all four in the back of the head. Their bodies were subsequently dumped into a canal. Members of Hatley's unit were later interviewed, and some said they participated or witnessed the murders.

Previously, Hatley was involved in the 2007 Scott Thomas Beauchamp controversy. Hatley was serving as Beauchamp's company first sergeant when Beauchamp authored a diary published as an article in The New Republic. Subsequently, a conservative blogger, looking for information on Beauchamp's claims, initiated an email exchange with Hatley. Hatley's response refuting Beauchamp's stories was then published. As Beauchamp's senior NCO, Hatley was interviewed during the Army's criminal investigation into The New Republic allegations.

== Court martial ==
=== Pretrial conditions and trial timeline ===
In January 2008, after Hatley's unit returned to their home station in Schweinfurt, Germany, one of the soldiers reported the murders. On 18 January 2008, Hatley's battalion commander gave Hatley an order to have no contact with the other soldiers in his company until the investigation was complete. The commander also ordered Hatley to remain under the supervision of his command sergeant major (CSM, the most senior ranking NCO of battalion and higher units) until he was interviewed by Army criminal investigators the following day and to remain on the installation.

Hatley continued his preparations for reassignment, cleared his family quarters, and placed his household goods in shipment. In February 2008, however, his orders were revoked and he was assigned to live in bachelor quarters at a soon-to-close installation in Würzburg, Germany, about a 30-minute drive from Schweinfurt. Hatley was denied leave to accompany his wife back to the U.S. His wife returned to live with Hatley in Germany a few weeks later. By April, Hatley was again assigned family quarters in Schweinfurt and received his household goods from storage.

From February to May 2008, Hatley's primary duty was to report daily to his CSM. From February to April, Hatley drove himself from Würzburg to Schweinfurt. Hatley's CSM sought an appropriate position for Hatley, and in late May or early June 2008, Hatley began duties at the housing office in Schweinfurt, where he worked until his trial in April 2009. During this time, Hatley was granted several leaves, but he was not permitted to travel outside Germany.

On 16 September 2008, Hatley's command preferred court-martial charges against Hatley. On 8 October 2008, Hatley waived his right to an Article 32 pretrial investigation hearing (a prerequisite to trial by general court-martial). The convening authority referred Hatley's case to a general court-martial on 5 January 2009. Hatley was arraigned on 11 January 2009, 119 days after referral of charges. At arraignment, Hatley requested a trial date in early February 2009. Over defense objection, the military judge set trial for 13 April 2009 based on the government's request to complete the trials of multiple co-accuseds, including SFC Joseph Mayo and SGT Leahy, whose trials had not yet concluded. In February 2009, Sergeant Leahy pled not guilty, but was found guilty of premeditated murder and was sentenced, as required by UCMJ Art. 118, to a mandatory sentence of life in prison, with possibility for parole. He was also dishonorably discharged In March 2009, SFC Mayo pled guilty to premeditated murder in exchange for a pretrial agreement limiting his confinement to 30 years, rather than confinement for life otherwise required for conviction of premeditated murder. He was also dishonorably discharged.

Two others soldiers, Specialist Stephen Ribordy and Belmor Ramos, were present, but did not participate. In exchange for testifying against his codefendants, both pleaded guilty, Ribordy to being an accessory after the fact and Ramos to conspiracy to commit premeditated murder. Ribordy was sentenced to 8 months in prison and received a bad conduct discharge, while Ramos was sentenced to 7 months in prison, received a dishonorable discharge, and was ordered to forfeit all pay and allowances.

=== Trial ===
In April 2009, a U.S. Army court in Vilseck, Germany, found Hatley guilty of premeditated murder and conspiracy to commit premeditated murder over the killings at the canal in Baghdad. According to testimony given at his trial, Hatley, Sergeant First Class Joseph P. Mayo, and Sergeant Michael Leahy had transported the detainees to a western neighborhood of the al Rashid district in Baghdad, shot the bound and blindfolded men in the back of the head, and then dumped their bodies in a canal. At the time of the murders, the three American soldiers were assigned to Company A, 1st Battalion of the 18th Infantry Regiment. Hatley was sentenced to life in prison, but will be eligible for parole after 20 years. He was reduced in rank to private, dishonorably discharged, and forfeited all pay and allowances.

=== Parole ===
On October 19, 2020, Hatley was released on parole after serving eleven years of his sentence.

In 2009, a military clemency board later reduced Leahy's sentence from life imprisonment to 20 years, and upgraded his dishonorable discharge to a bad conduct discharge. He has since been released from prison.

Mayo was released on parole on November 30, 2015.
