= Pacific Standard =

American magazine (2008–2019)

- Editor-in-chief: Nicholas Jackson
- Categories: Environment, solutions-driven journalism, social issues, health, public policy, economics, social science, education
- Frequency: Bimonthly
- Publisher: Sara Miller McCune
- Total circulation (June 2011): 110,332
- Founded: 2008
- Final issue: August 16, 2019 (final online article)
- Company: The Social Justice Foundation
- Country: United States
- Based in: Santa Barbara, California
- Language: English
- Website: psmag.com
- ISSN: 1941-5672

Pacific Standard, founded as Miller–McCune, was an American nonprofit magazine that reported on issues of social and environmental justice. Founded in 2008, the magazine was published in print and online for its first ten years. It was published by The Social Justice Foundation, headquartered in Santa Barbara, California. On August 16, 2019, a week after its primary funder backed away, it posted its last new article.

== History ==
Miller–McCune was launched in 2008 by Sara Miller McCune, the founder and head of SAGE Publications. It was named one of the year's "hottest launches" by MIN magazine and received the same honor from Library Journal the following year. It also received the 2008–2009 Society of Environmental Journalists Award for Outstanding Explanatory Journalism and the Utne Reader Independent Press Award 2009 for science/technology coverage. In 2010, Miller McCune was named by Folio magazine to the FOLIO: 40 list of publishing innovators: "At a time when print is becoming a secondary product for many publishers (in mindset if not revenue), Miller–McCune is succeeding with long-form journalism."

The magazine was created for opinion leaders, policymakers, and concerned citizens who are interested in developing solutions to some of the world's toughest social and environmental problems. Its target readers are "influentials" who read The Economist, The Atlantic, Mother Jones, and Wired, but former editor-in-chief Streshinsky differentiated Pacific Standard by focusing on the behavioral and social sciences. In an interview, Streshinsky said:

... we're also committed to producing old-fashioned, well-told, deeply reported magazine journalism on subjects and characters of national interest or curiosity—we just want to do it in a way that is especially steeped in the relevant research literature and intellectual context. We value great storytelling and cogent analysis as much as anyone else on the block. And we love "conceptual scoops"—the kind of piece that can powerfully, sharply, and accurately reframe the reader's understanding of an important, complex subject.

In 2010, the magazine launched Miller–McCune LIVE, a special events program to bring articles to life through comprehensive debate featuring industry leaders. The first debate, on lobbying, took place in September in Washington, D.C. The second debate was held in New York City in November with panelists Sree Sreenivasan and Rachel Sklar, who dug into the effects of social media on "real life" and ways to humanize the Internet.

In-depth pieces include stories, such as "Native Environmentalism and the Alberta Oil Boom", "Global Warming: the Archaeological Frontier", "When Facebook Is Your Medical Record", and "Art and Alzheimer's: Another Way of Remembering", the story of Hilda Goldblatt Gorenstein (Hilgos), and the documentary I Remember Better When I Paint.

=== Transition to Pacific Standard ===
In April 2011, editor John Mecklin announced his resignation, citing "creative differences" among other reasons. On May 17, the organization announced that Maria Streshinsky, former managing editor of The Atlantic magazine, would become the editor-in-chief of the magazine.

In February 2012, Miller–McCune announced that the magazine's name would be changed to Pacific Standard as of the May–June 2012 edition. In a May 2012 interview, Streshinsky said that the publication's new name reflected its taking a "western" perspective: "We want to tell the nationally important stories that are coming out of this side of the country, and from the edges of the Pacific.... So many of the nation's biggest shifts have come from the West, and we want to showcase that."

As of January 2014, the magazine enjoyed its largest website traffic month ever. It continues to get most of its funding from SAGE Publications, with much smaller amounts from subscription, newsstand, and website revenue. In 2014, Pacific Standard was nominated for its first-ever National Magazine Award, presented by the American Society of Magazine Editors, in the category of General Excellence for Literature, Science and Politics Magazines.

In 2015, digital director Nicholas Jackson was appointed editor-in-chief, and senior editor Ryan Jacobs was appointed deputy editor. They quickly brought on creative director Taylor Le and executive editor Jennifer Sahn. Jackson repositioned the magazine to tell "stories that matter," focusing most heavily on social and environmental justice.

In 2017, the magazine was honored with its second National Magazine Award. Also in 2017, Pacific Standard' nonprofit parent changed its name from the Miller-McCune Center for Research, Media, and Public Policy to The Social Justice Foundation.

=== Demise ===
Production of the print edition ceased in 2018 and it transitioned to an online-only format. On August 7, 2019, Nicholas Jackson, editor-in-chief, stated on Twitter that Pacific Standard was to close after its primary funder abruptly cut off all funding. On August 16, 2019,Pacific Standard posted its final new online story.

On June 2, 2020, the CEO of Grist Magazine, Inc, Brady Walkinshaw, announced that the company had bought the Pacific Standard and would be maintaining an online archive of the defunct magazines' articles.
