= TRB (writer) =

TRB is the name given the lead column of each issue of The New Republic magazine.

Historically, the writer most closely identified with "TRB" was Richard Strout, who wrote "TRB" from 1943 to 1983. Other TRB columnists have included Michael Kinsley, Andrew Sullivan, Peter Beinart, Jonathan Chait, and Timothy Noah.

On the origin of the name "TRB", Richard Strout said:

Bruce Bliven invented that. They wanted it—the magazine was published in New York at that time and they wanted an inside column from Washington, and they wouldn't have a name on it because they wanted to alternate it with various newspapermen. Frank Kent was the first one, so they decided they would put some initials on it, and they waited and waited and finally the composing room man came to them said, "You've got a half an hour to think what you are going to sign on it, the initials." And Bruce Bliven had just come over from Brooklyn on the Brooklyn Rapid Transit, the BRT, so he just changed it around from BRT to TRB.

(Though the Brooklyn Rapid Transit Company had been acquired in bankruptcy court in 1923 by the Brooklyn–Manhattan Transit Corporation (BMT), the old initials were still well known.)
