= Crimi =

Crimi is a surname of Italian origin, derived from the Greek name Klēmēs, itself derived from the Latin name Clemens. Notable people with the name include:

- Alfred D. Crimi (1900–1994), Italian-American painter
- Carolyn Crimi (born 1959), American author of children's books
- Giulio Crimi (1885–1939), Italian opera singer
- Marco Crimi (born 1990), Italian footballer
- Vito Crimi (born 1972), Italian politician
