= Alice B. McGinty =

American writer of children's books

Alice Blumenthal McGinty is an American writer of children's books.

McGinty was born in 1963 in Minneapolis, Minnesota. She attended Indiana University and the University of Illinois Urbana-Champaign. McGinty is Jewish. She is a member of the Society of Children's Book Writers and Illustrators.

== Selected works ==
- Ten Little Lambs. Illustrated by Melissa Sweet. Dial, 2002.
- Thank You, World. Illustrated by Wendy Anderson Halperin. Dial Books Young Readers, 2007.
- Eliza's Kindergarten Surprise. Illustrated by Nancy Speir. Amazon Children's Publishing, 2007.
- Darwin: With Glimpses into His Private Journal and Letters. Illustrated by Mary Azarian. HMH Books for Young Readers, 2009.
- Gandhi: A March to the Sea. Illustrated by Thomas Gonzalez. Two Lions, 2013.
- Rabbi Benjamin's Buttons. Illustrated by Jennifer Black Reinhardt. Charlesbridge, 2014.
- The Girl Who Named Pluto. Illustrated by Elizabeth Haidle. Schwartz & Wade Books, 2019.
- Pancakes to Parathas: Breakfast around the World. Illustrated by Tomoko Suzuki. Little Bee Books, 2019.
- A Story for Small Bear. Illustrated by Richard Jones. Schwartz & Wade, 2020.
- The Sea Knows. With Alan B. Havis. Illustrated by Stephanie Laberis. Simon & Schuster/Paula Wiseman Books, 2020.
- The Water Lady. Illustrated by Shonto Begay. Schwartz & Wade Books, 2021.
- Step by Step. Illustrated by Diane Goode. Simon Schuster/Paula Wiseman Books, 2021.
- My Israel and Me. Illustrated by Rotem Teplow. Kalaniot Books, 2021
- Bathe the Cat. Illustrated by David Roberts. Chronicle Books, 2022.
- A Synagogue Just Like Home. Illustrated by Laurel Molk. Candlewick Press, 2022.
- Feasts and Festivals around the World. Illustrated by Tomoko Suzuki. Little Bee Books, 2022.
