= Scott Thomas Beauchamp controversy =

Arguments about certain reports about American soldiers in Iraq

In 2007, Scott Thomas Beauchamp (born 1983 in St. Louis, Missouri), a United States Army private, (Note: Beauchamp served in the Iraq War as a member of Alpha Company, 1-18 Infantry, Second Brigade Combat Team, First Infantry Division.) filed three entries in The New Republic (TNR) using the pen name "Scott Thomas" about serving at Forward Operating Base Falcon in Baghdad. These entries concerned alleged misconduct by soldiers, including Beauchamp, in post-invasion Iraq.

Several publications and bloggers questioned Beauchamp's statements, specifically episodes in which soldiers were described running over feral dogs, playing with an Iraqi child's skull, and making cruel comments toward an injured Iraqi civilian woman. A U.S. Army investigation had concluded some statements in the material were false. The New Republic investigated the statements, first standing by the content of Beauchamp's articles for several months, then concluding that they could no longer stand by this material.

Beauchamp's first sergeant, John E. Hatley, was later prosecuted by the U.S. Army and sentenced to life in prison for murdering four Iraqi civilians. The editor of The New Republic who oversaw the publication of Beauchamp's essays, Franklin Foer, commented in 2010 that "I think the coverage of Scott Beauchamp was an object lesson in media stupidity. Every single major American news organization made a huge deal about possible embellishments in his description of plausible incidents-and ignored the actual war crimes committed in his unit."

Beauchamp went on to serve a second Infantry tour in Iraq, and was honorably discharged from the U.S. Army in 2010.

== "Shock Troops" ==
In a diary entry in The New Republic, Beauchamp claims he ridiculed a woman in Iraq whose face had been severely burned: "I love chicks that have been intimate with IEDs" (improvised explosive devices), Beauchamp quotes himself as saying, loudly, to his friends in the chow hall. "It really turns me on—melted skin, missing limbs, plastic noses," he recounted. "My friend was practically falling out of his chair laughing...The disfigured woman slammed her cup down and ran out of the chow hall."

Next, he described finding the remains of children in a mass grave uncovered while his unit constructed a combat outpost: "One private...found the top part of a human skull... As he marched around with the skull on his head, people dropped shovels and sandbags, folding in half with laughter ... No one was disgusted. Me included."

Finally, Beauchamp described another soldier "who only really enjoyed driving Bradley Fighting Vehicles because it gave him the opportunity to run things over. He took out curbs, concrete barriers, corners of buildings, stands in the market, and his favorite target: dogs." Beauchamp described how the soldier killed three dogs in one day: "He slowed the Bradley down to lure the first kill in, and, as the diesel engine grew quieter, the dog walked close enough for him to jerk the machine hard to the right and snag its leg under the tracks."

== "Baghdad Diarist" ==
After the publication of "Shock Troops", neocon outlets ranging from The Weekly Standard to National Review questioned the veracity of Beauchamp's statements. For example, The Weekly Standard reported that one of the anonymous military experts consulted by TNR refuted Beauchamp's allegations regarding Bradley Fighting Vehicles. As the controversy continued, The Washington Post reported that Beauchamp did not provide documentation for his three published columns.

In a follow-up posting on The New Republic, Beauchamp objected to charges of falsification: "It's been maddening...to see the plausibility of events that I witnessed questioned by people who have never served in Iraq. I was initially reluctant to take the time out of my already insane schedule fighting an actual war in order to play some role in an ideological battle that I never wanted to join."

New Republic editor Franklin Foer disclosed that Beauchamp was married to Elle Reeve, a former New Republic reporter and fact checker, and that his relationship with Reeve was "part of the reason why we found him to be a credible writer." Accused of insufficient fact-checking, the magazine had, according to Foer, planned to "re-report every detail", but the magazine later stated that their investigation was "short circuited" after the Army severed Beauchamp's communications with anyone overseas.

== New Republic investigation ==
Transcript of Conversation between Scott Thomas Beauchamp and The New Republic

A July 31, 2007, memorandum from Major John D. Cross, the Investigating Officer, entitled "Legal Review of AR 15-6 Investigation Regarding Allegations of Soldier Misconduct Published in The New Republic" found:

- That the incident of blatant disrespect for a disfigured woman in the FOB Falcon DFAC is a tale completely fabricated by Private Beauchamp. (The New Republic issued a correction days later saying the story took place in Kuwait, not Iraq.)
- That the desecration of human remains and the discovery of a "Saddam-era dumping ground" is false.
- That the deliberate targeting of wild dogs is completely unfounded.
- That Private Beauchamp desired to use his experiences to enhance his writing and provide legitimacy to his work possibly becoming the next Hemmingway [sic].
- That Private Beauchamp is not a credible source for making the allegation he wrote about in "Shock Troops." He admitted that he was not an eyewitness to the targeting of dogs and only saw animal bones during the construction of Combat Outpost Ellis. Combined with the piece of fiction that he wrote on May 8, 2006, on his blog, I find that Private Beauchamp takes small bits of truth and twists and exaggerates them into fictional account that he puts forth as the whole truth for public consumption.

In an August 2 statement, after an internal investigation, editors for The New Republic defended Beauchamp's statements, with one exception—that the conversation about the disfigured woman had occurred at Camp Buehring in Kuwait, not Iraq, an error for which The New Republic apologized to its readers. According to the statement, five anonymous members of Beauchamp's company had also confirmed the other aspects of Beauchamp's entry.

We...spoke with current and former soldiers, forensic experts, and other journalists who have covered the war extensively. And we sought assistance from Army Public Affairs officers. Most important, we spoke with five other members of Beauchamp's company, and all corroborated Beauchamp's anecdotes, which they witnessed or, in the case of one soldier, heard about contemporaneously. (All of the soldiers we interviewed who had first-hand knowledge of the episodes requested anonymity.)

The statement continued to say that the Army's investigation had impeded their own investigation, because communication with Beauchamp had been cut off, and "his fellow soldiers no longer feel comfortable communicating with reporters...If further substantive information comes to light, TNR will, of course, share it with you." The New Republic's Jason Zengerle was told by the Army there was no evidence of a horribly burned woman at a Kuwait base camp after the magazine published its Editor's Note on the matter. Peter Scoblic, executive editor of TNR, has stated to Beauchamp directly that "I understand why there are questions being raised about the piece".

On August 9, 2007, a spokesman for the 4th Brigade, 1st Infantry Division clarified the results of the Army investigation in an e-mail interview with the Associated Press:

During that investigation, all the soldiers from his unit refuted all statements that Pvt. Beauchamp made in his blog.

In a "Memorandum of Concern" issued September 1, 2007, the commanding officer of Beauchamp's battalion, Lieutenant Colonel George A. Glaze, wrote in part:

The New Republic published an article, authored by you, under your pen name, Scott Thomas. This article contained gross exaggerations and inaccurate allegations of misconduct by Vanguard Soldiers. Your article discredited the service of your fellow Vanguard Soldiers and comrades at arms. Between January 2006 and September 2006, you published sensitive information about your unit's deployment dates on your personal web log. By placing this sensitive information in the public domain, you jeopardized the lives of Vanguard Soldiers and the Vanguard mission.

== Alleged recantation ==
On August 6, 2007, the Weekly Standard's blog reported that Scott Thomas Beauchamp recanted under oath to Army investigators. On August 7, The New Republic reported:

We've talked to military personnel directly involved in the events that Scott Thomas Beauchamp described, and they corroborated his account as detailed in our statement. When we called Army spokesman Major Steven F. Lamb and asked about an anonymously sourced allegation that Beauchamp had recanted his articles in a sworn statement, he told us, 'I have no knowledge of that.' He added, 'If someone is speaking anonymously [to The Weekly Standard], they are on their own.' When we pressed Lamb for details on the Army investigation, he told us, 'We don't go into the details of how we conduct our investigations.'

Michael Goldfarb and the Weekly Standard stood by the story.

On October 24, 2007, the Drudge Report website published the transcript of a phone call that occurred on September 7, 2007, between Beauchamp and senior TNR staff, including Franklin Foer. In this conversation, Beauchamp refused to affirm the accuracy of his reports, despite pressure from Foer to do so. Foer confirmed the accuracy of the transcript, but asserted that Beauchamp did not recant his story and claimed that independent, anonymous sources have backed up Beauchamps's charges and therefore TNR will not retract the stories. Kathryn Jean Lopez, National Review Online's editor also questioned the accuracy of Drudge's characterization of The New Republic interview as a recantation.

Hours later, the documents were no longer available at the Drudge Report. National Review Online posted the documents on its website. These documents, and other details of the Army investigation, in spite of being confirmed by National Review as real, were not officially released. "We are not going into the details of the investigation," Maj. Steven F. Lamb, deputy public affairs officer in Baghdad, wrote in an e-mail message. "The allegations are false, [Beauchamp's] platoon and company were interviewed, and no one could substantiate the claims he made."

== The New Republic "cannot stand by these stories" ==
A December 2007 article by Franklin Foer lengthily addresses the issues of the controversy, concluding:

In retrospect, we never should have put Beauchamp in this situation. He was a young soldier in a war zone, an untried writer without journalistic training. We published his accounts of sensitive events while granting him the shield of anonymity—which, in the wrong hands, can become license to exaggerate, if not fabricate. When I last spoke with Beauchamp in early November, he continued to stand by his stories. Unfortunately, the standards of this magazine require more than that. And, in light of the evidence available to us, after months of intensive re-reporting, we cannot be confident that the events in his pieces occurred in exactly the manner that he described them. Without that essential confidence, we cannot stand by these stories.

== See also ==
- John E. Hatley – Beauchamp's First Sergeant, later convicted of war crimes
- Duke lacrosse case
- Journalism ethics and standards
- A Rape on Campus
