= Diane Heiman =

Diane Heiman is an author of nonfiction for children.

== Biography ==
Heiman is a graduate of Brown University and Georgetown Law School.

Heiman writes about Jewish topics. She is senior editor of Moment.

A Publishers Weekly review of her book It's a ... It's a ... It's a Mitzvah (Jewish Lights, 2012) said, "Pleasant dialogue and humorous illustrations provide clear-cut situations in which even the youngest participants can learn to do a mitzvah".

== Selected works ==
- See What You Can Be: Explore Careers That Could Be for You! With Liz Suneby. American Girl Publishing, 2007.
- The Mitzvah Project Book. With Liz Suneby. Jewish Lights, 2011.
- It's a ... It's a ... It's a Mitzvah. With Liz Suneby. Illustrated by Laurel Molk. Jewish Lights, 2012.
- The JGuy's Guide: The GPS for Jewish Teen Guys. With Joseph B. Meszler, Shulamit Reinharz, and Liz Suneby. Jewish Lights, 2013.
