= Michael Kinsley =

American political journalist and commentator

Michael E. Kinsley (born March 9, 1951) is an American political journalist and commentator. Primarily active in print media as both a writer and editor, he also became known to television audiences as a co-host on Crossfire.

== Early life and education ==
Kinsley was born in Detroit, Michigan, the son of Lillian (Margolis) and George Kinsley, who practiced medicine. Kinsley is Jewish. He attended the Cranbrook School in Bloomfield Hills, Michigan, then graduated from Harvard College in 1972. At Harvard, Kinsley served as vice president of the university's daily newspaper, The Harvard Crimson. He was awarded a Rhodes Scholarship and studied at Magdalen College, Oxford, then returned to Harvard for law school.

== Early career ==
While a third-year law student, Kinsley began working at The New Republic. He was allowed to finish his Harvard juris doctor degree through courses at the evening program at George Washington University Law School.

Kinsley's first exposure to a national television audience was as moderator of William Buckley's Firing Line. In 1979, he became editor of The New Republic and wrote the magazine's TRB column for most of the 1980s and 1990s. That column was reprinted in a variety of newspaper op-ed pages, including The Washington Post, and made Kinsley's reputation as a leading political writer. He shared the 1986 Gerald Loeb Award for Commentary.

In 1984, he wrote that "A gaffe is when a politician tells the truth", giving rise to the concept of a Kinsley gaffe. In 1986, he organized a contest for readers of The New Republic to find a newspaper headline more boring than "Worthwhile Canadian Initiative". The contest was won by "Debate goes on over the nature of reality", and "Worthwhile Canadian Initiative" became a long-running joke among journalists and bloggers.

Kinsley also served as managing editor of Washington Monthly (in the mid-1970s, while still in school), editor at Harper's (for a year and a half in the early 1980s), and American editor of The Economist (a short-term, honorary position).

== Crossfire and Slate ==
From 1989 to 1995, Kinsley appeared on CNN's Crossfire, co-hosting with conservative Pat Buchanan. Representing the liberal position in the televised political debates, Kinsley combined a dry wit with nerdy demeanor and analytical skills.

In January 1995, Kinsley had a cameo on the first episode of the TV sitcom Women of the House, in which the show's main character, Suzanne Sugarbaker, was a guest on Crossfire. He also appeared in three movies during the 1990s: Rising Sun (1993), Dave (also 1993), and The Birdcage (1996).

After leaving Crossfire in 1995, Kinsley returned to his editorial roots, relocating to Seattle to become founding editor of Microsoft's online journal, Slate. In 1998 he was considered for the position of editor in chief of The New Yorker. In 1999 he was named Editor of the Year by the Columbia Journalism Review for his work at Slate.

Kinsley stepped down from Slate in 2002, shortly after disclosing that he had Parkinson's disease.

== Subsequent positions ==
External videos
- Booknotes interview with Kinsley on Big Babies, January 21, 1996, C-SPAN
- Presentation by Kinsley on Please Don't Remain Calm, May 8, 2008, C-SPAN
- Q&A interview with Kinsley on Old Age: A Beginners Guide, May 22, 2016, C-SPAN

Kinsley next moved to the Los Angeles Times as editorial page editor in April 2004. He maintained his Seattle residence and often worked from there, commuting to Los Angeles on a part-time basis. During his tenure, Kinsley tried to overhaul the paper's editorial page and led an abortive experiment with a Wikitorial, while also receiving criticism from USC professor and feminist advocate Susan Estrich alleging a dearth of editorials written by women. Kinsley announced his departure in September 2005 after a falling out with the publisher.

He returned to writing a weekly column for The Washington Post and Slate, and in 2006 he served briefly as American editor of The Guardian. He also became a regular columnist for Time magazine, but in May 2009 wrote that the magazine had "dumped" him.

On September 9, 2010, Kinsley and MSNBC pundit Joe Scarborough joined the staff of Politico as the publication's first opinion columnists. On April 29, 2011, Bloomberg L.P. announced that Kinsley had joined the Bloomberg View editorial board. In January 2013, Kinsley re-joined The New Republic as editor at large. In January 2014, Vanity Fair announced that Kinsley would become a contributing editor and write a monthly column.

== Personal life ==
In 2002, Kinsley married Patty Stonesifer, a longtime top executive at Microsoft and the Bill and Melinda Gates Foundation. (As a Microsoft vice president, she had managed the Microsoft news portion of the MSNBC merger, which included Slate.) Stonesifer has two adult children from a previous marriage. She is president and CEO of Martha's Table, a non-profit that develops sustainable solutions to poverty.

In 2002, Kinsley revealed that he had Parkinson's disease, and on July 12, 2006, he underwent deep brain stimulation, a type of surgery designed to reduce its symptoms.

== See also ==
- Kinsley gaffe
- List of newspaper columnists
