= Richard Strout =

American journalist and commentator

Richard Lee Strout (March 14, 1898 – August 19, 1990) was an American journalist and commentator. He was national correspondent for The Christian Science Monitor from 1923 and he wrote the "TRB from Washington" column for The New Republic from 1943 to 1983; he collected the best of his columns in TRB: Views and Perspectives on the Presidency (New York: Macmillan, 1979), a book notable for showing that Strout was one of the first observers of the American presidency to express worry about what later scholars and journalists came to call the imperial presidency.

== Early life and education ==
Strout was born in Cohoes, New York, on March 14, 1898, and was raised in Brooklyn. His middle name, Lee, was in memory of the birth place of his mother, Susan Lang Strout in Lee New Hampshire. Richard was proud of his New England background and his Lang family connections. Richard graduated from Harvard University in 1919.

== Career ==
In 1919, he moved to England to work in journalism before returning to the United States in 1921, and held various newspaper positions for several years before beginning an association with The Christian Science Monitor, where he worked until his retirement in 1984. He received a master's degree in economics from Harvard in 1923.

He won the George Polk Memorial Award for national reporting in 1958 and a special Pulitzer Prize for Journalism in 1978. The Special Award cited "distinguished commentary from Washington over many years as staff correspondent for The Christian Science Monitor and contributor to The New Republic." In 1973, Strout received the Golden Plate Award of the American Academy of Achievement.

== Death ==
Strout was a resident of Washington, D.C., where he died there on August 19, 1990, eleven days after being hospitalized for a fall. He is buried in the Lang cemetery in Lee, New Hampshire beside his parents and wife.
