= Nancy Speir =

American sculptor, painter, and graphic artist

Nancy Speir (born April 25, 1958) is an American sculptor, painter, and graphic artist. She is best known as an illustrator of children's books.

== Biography ==
=== Early life ===
Nancy Speir was born on April 25, 1958, in Tulsa, Oklahoma. Her father, Charles Lucas Speir, was an electrician for American Airlines who died of brain cancer when Speir was three years old. Then she and her family moved to Kansas City, Missouri. Her mother, Elaine Le Blanc-Speir, née Palmier, "remarried a cruel and emotionally unstable" alcoholic. Speir often moved within Kansas City as a child, and she had few friends due to the transient lifestyle. She loved animals but had to give up her pets when she moved. She managed the trauma of her youth by drawing.

Speir attended Kansas City Art Institute; she later said she hated art school. Speir married Matthew Donald Rudie, a construction company operations manager, in 1983. She had met him on a Hallmark research trip.

=== Career ===
Speir lives in Santa Rosa, California. She was an artist and supervisor at Hallmark Cards in Kansas City, MO, and Palo Alto, California. She was a designer for Sanrio, Inc.

She has worked as a freelance artist since 1986. Her exhibitions have included Humor 2, Society of Illustrators, New York City in 1988 and Illustration Annual, Communication Arts Magazine in 1988.

Speir has illustrated several children's books for various authors, including two written by Alice B. McGinty and three written by Patricia Hubbell.

About her work in Eliza's Kindergarten Surprise (Amazon Children's Publishing, 2007), Kirkus Reviews said, "Speir’s acrylic paintings rely on bright, bold colors to capture the reader’s attention. The simplicity of her illustrations allows readers to connect with Eliza’s changing emotions". Publishers Weekly wrote, "a spare, cartoon quality evokes an easygoing, childlike feel".

Kirkus Reviews noted how in Teacher: Showing, Helping, Caring (Marshall Cavendish, 2009), "Speir’s bright acrylics depict a multiethnic classroom full of all the right impedimenta (computer, chalkboard, reading corner) and presided over by a white, bespectacled, pixie-cut woman" in a critical review that ended, "It’s too bad, though, that neither author nor illustrator chose to break the stereotype just a teensy bit".

== Selected works ==
- Henny Penny. Written by Wallace C. Wadsworth. Checkerboard Press, 1986.
- Mr. Boffin. Written by Laurence Schorsch. Checkerboard, 1993.
- The Animal Picnic. Written by Leslie D. Perkins. Scholastic, 1994.
- Eliza's Kindergarten Surprise. Written by Alice B. McGinty. Amazon Children's Publishing, 2007.
- My First Airplane Ride! Written by Patricia Hubbell. Marshall Cavendish, 2008.
- Teacher: Showing, Helping, Caring. Written by Patricia Hubbell. Marshall Cavendish, 2009.
- Check It Out! Written by Patricia Hubbell. Marshall Cavendish, 2011.
- Eliza's Kindergarten Pet. Written by Alice B. McGinty. Two Lions, 2012.
