= Elle Reeve =

American journalist (born c. 1982)

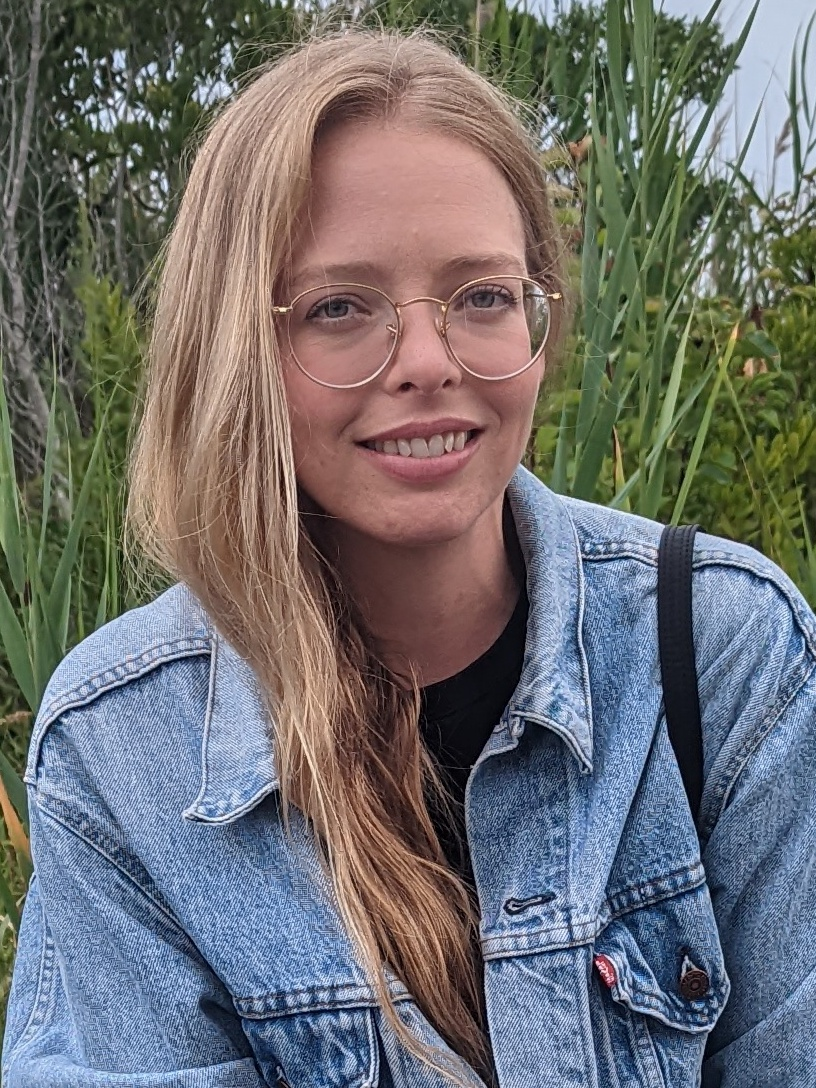
- Reeve in 2022
- Born: 1981 or 1982 (age 43–44)
- Other name: Elspeth Reeve
- Education: University of Missouri (BA)
- Occupation: Journalist
- Years active: 2005–present
- Known for: Reporting for CNN and HBO's Vice News Tonight
- Notable work: Charlottesville: Race and Terror
- Spouse(s): Scott Thomas Beauchamp (m. 2007, divorced) Jeremy Greenfield (m. 2018)
- Children: 1

Elspeth "Elle" Reeve (Note: "Elle" is pronounced /ˈɛliː/) (born 1981 or 1982) is an American journalist. Before joining CNN as a correspondent in 2019, she reported on the 2017 white-nationalist Unite the Right rally in Charlottesville, Virginia for HBO's Vice News Tonight. Reeve and Vice News Tonight won a Peabody Award, four Emmy Awards, and a George Polk Award for their reporting.

== Education and career ==
Reeve attended the Missouri School of Journalism, earning a Bachelor of Journalism degree in 2005. After graduating, she interned at Time magazine and worked for the Center for Public Integrity in Washington, D.C.

Before joining Vice News, Reeve was a senior editor at The New Republic and politics editor at The Wire. She has also written articles for The Atlantic and The Daily Beast. While working for The New Republic, Reeve was assigned to fact-check allegations by her then-husband Scott Thomas Beauchamp of widespread American war crimes against Iraqi civilians. The allegations were later retracted after facing criticism by conservative bloggers.

Reeve covered the August 2017 Unite the Right rally in Charlottesville, Virginia for Vice News Tonight, during which she interviewed neo-Nazi Christopher Cantwell, alt-right leader Richard B. Spencer and other white supremacist demonstrators, capturing soon-to-be-viral footage of attendees carrying tiki torches while chanting "Jews will not replace us!". Her report, entitled Charlottesville: Race and Terror, earned both her and Vice News Tonight a Peabody Award, four Emmy Awards, and a George Polk Award.

In 2018, Fast Company included Reeve on their 2018 list of the "most creative people in business". She was nominated for a Shorty Award for journalism the same year. Reeve joined CNN as a correspondent in 2019.

== Personal life ==
Reeve married United States Army Private Scott Thomas Beauchamp in 2007; they later divorced. On New Year's Eve in 2018, Reeve married Jeremy Greenfield. She gave birth to her first child in February 2024. As of 2024, Reeve resides in New York City.

== Selected publications ==
- Reeve, Elle (2024). Black Pill: How I Witnessed the Darkest Corners of the Internet Come to Life, Poison Society, and Capture American Politics. New York: Simon and Schuster. ISBN 978-1-9821-9888-6.
  - Excerpt published as "'Don't F-cking Leave': How Neo-Nazis and White Supremacists Trap Their Followers in the Movement Forever". Vanity Fair. July 1, 2024.
- "Watch VICE News Tonight's full episode 'Charlottesville: Race and Terror'". Vice News. August 21, 2017.
