= Shonto Begay =

Native American artist, illustrator, writer, and educator

Shonto Begay is a Native American artist, illustrator, writer, and teacher. He began his artistic career in 1983 and his art features landscapes and other cultural elements of Navajo life.

== Biography and education ==
Begay was born into the Diné tribe on February 7, 1954, near Shonto, Arizona. His mother was a Navajo weaver from the Bitter Water clan and his father was a medicine man from the Salt clan. Begay was named via a traditional Navajo naming ceremony that is held once a baby has their first laugh; this name is only used by family members and Begay was given an American name by the government, "Wilson". Begay later changed this first name to his great-great grandmother's name, Shonto.

Begay had fifteen siblings and his family lived in three hogans, which had no water or power. He spent his childhood herding sheep, reading books, and drawing. Begay did not initially see art as a viable career until he reached high school, as he initially believed that everyone knew how to draw. He attended a residential boarding school near Flagstaff, where he was expected to assimilate into western society. He, along with other children, were prohibited from expressing any aspects of their culture and would receive corporal punishment if they did otherwise. During this time, Begay coped with boarding school life by painting and drawing, which he often had to do in secret. This has prompted him to describe the act of painting as "removing myself from harsh reality and living in that world of beauty I have the power to create with my hand". During the summer Begay was allowed to return home to his parents, where he made sure to spend the time immersed in his culture.

Begay eventually left his reservation to attend the Institute of American Indian Arts, where he graduated with an associate degree in fine arts in 1976. He then attended the California College of Arts and Crafts, where he received his bachelor's degree in Fine Arts. While in California he met and married his former wife Cruz, with whom he had four children.

Begay has worked as a National Parks ranger in Arizona and Wyoming and in 1983, began to paint professionally. He later moved back to his Navajo reservation in Arizona and currently lives in Kayenta, where he works on his art in a hogan located about 30 miles away from his house. He also teaches workshops to youth and believes that "art saves lives".

== Artworks ==
=== Art style and subject matter ===
Begay's paintings depicts many aspects of Native American life; he has stated that he paints the landscapes of his reservation, the spiritual and cultural lore of the Diné, and the harsh realities of life on the reservation. His art has been likened to the art movement of social realism, as critics have stated that his art fights against the romanticism of native life. His style has also been compared to that of Vincent van Gogh and neo-impressionists. Begay has commented about those comparisons, as he believes his style to be individualistic and that he paints "with an impressionistic sensibility" that he states comes from "the whole idea of reciting the chants, the ancient prayers. Every syllable of every word is recited to maintain the beauty. So, each stroke, each line, each color, dot, and dash — to me, those are syllables to the holy words I grew up with. I grew up in the rhythm of late-night chants, songs, and of course, the creation of holy sand paintings. I think a lot of the vision is coming from that."

Begay's artwork features a recurring characteristic where light seeps through and illuminates some elements of the painting, which Michael Abatemarco of the Santa Fe New Mexican states harmoniously balances beauty (light) with the subject matter of the painting.

=== Select artwork ===
==== Helpless ====
This painting was done in a birds-eye view, and it features a group of people scattered on the floor who appear to be unconscious; the only one awake is a kitten, and it is looking up, meaning it is staring at the viewer. A person's shadow can be seen holding the door open and observing the situation. Shonto discusses this painting during an interview; he mentions that the cat looking straight at the viewer reminds them that there is still hope in this chaotic world. He also discusses the shadow and how it represents the viewers dilemma, the dilemma being, "Do I step into this confusion and embrace it, or do I stay out of the light?"

==== Losing My Spirit For Salvation ====
This painting features a man who is emerging from the side of a mesa. The mesa is detailed with swirls and lines, and the background is detailed with etches of angels. The man who is emerging from the side of the mesa represents Shonto, and he expresses that this painting represents his relationship between the Navajo spiritual realm and Christianity. The man is coming out from the side of the mesa because the stories of Christianity are "alluring" to him.

==== Nightwalker ====
This painting features a starry night sky, and the floor is covered with snow. There is a figure walking through the snow, and the figure is see-through. Shonto says that this painting is "tickling the spirit world, people who have passed and still walking on the land, where they belonged".

== Exhibitions/shows ==
=== Solo exhibitions ===
- "Rhythm of the Blue Highway", Mark Sublette Medicine Man Gallery (Foothills, Arizona), October 1–31, 2018.
- "Artist Talk with Shonto Begay", The Wheelwright Museum of the American Indian (Santa Fe, New Mexico), November 5, 2017.
- "Aje' Ji' :The Heart Way", Modern West Fine Art Gallery (Salt Lake City, Utah), February 17- March 11, 2017.
- "Map of My Heart", The Museum of Northern Arizona (Flagstaff, Arizona), June 22 – October 19, 2014.
- "Solo Show", Mark Sublette Medicine Man Gallery (Foothills, Arizona), 2013.
- "Reclaimed by Snakeweeds IV", Santa Fe Indian Market, 2008.

=== Group exhibitions ===
- "Modern West Holidays", Modern West Fine Art Gallery (Salt Lake City, Utah), November 19, 2019 – January 10, 2020.
- "The Western Sublime: Majestic Landscapes of the American West", Tucson Museum of Art and Historic Block (Tucson, Arizona), October 19, 2019– February 9, 2020.
- "Into a New West", Briscoe Museum (San Antonio, Texas), May 24- September 1, 2019.
- "Six Navajo Masters: Abeyta, Begay, Johns, Whitehorse, Whitethorne & Yazzie", Chiaroscuro Contemporary Art Gallery, May 16- August 4, 2019.
- "Small Works", Modern West Fine Art Gallery (Salt Lake City, Utah) December 7, 2018 – January 12, 2019.
- "Along the Distant Mesa: An Homage to Maynard Nixon", Mark Sublette Medicine Man Gallery, 2019.
- "Native Voices", Modern West Fine Art Gallery (Salk Lake City, Utah), July 21- September 9, 2017.
- "Native American Portraiture", Rainmaker Gallery (Bristol, England), October 5–28, 2015.
- " The 7c's of Arizona", The Phoenix Airport Museum (Phoenix, Arizona), October 21, 2014– April 19, 2015.
- "Bierstadt to Warhol: American Indians in the West", Utah Museum of Fine Arts (Salt Lake City, Utah), February 15 – August 11, 2013.
- Messengers 2012", Rainmaker Gallery (Bristol, England), June 13- July 25, 2012.
- "10th Shonto Art Show", Brandy's Restaurant and Bakery (Flagstaff, Arizona), 2008.

== Collections ==
Shonto Begay's work can be seen in the following collections:

- The Avery Collection of American Indian Paintings, Arizona State Museum.
- IAIA Museum of Contemporary Native Arts
- Mark Sublette Medicine Man Gallery
- Modern West Fine Art Gallery
- West of The Moon Gallery

== Honors and awards ==
Shonto Begay has received the following honors and awards:

- 2022 Honor for The Water Lady
- 2020 Viola Legacy Award
- 2015 Best of Flag Award (Local Artist)
- 2015 Viola Award for Excellence in the Arts
- 2008 1st place in Painting, Santa Fe Indian Market
- 1993 Best Arizona Artist
- 1993 Arizona Author Award
- 1991 Owl Award For Illustration
- 1988 Reading Rainbow Award (The Mud Pony)

== Publications and illustrations ==
=== Illustrations ===
- The Mud Pony (1988)
- The Boy Who Dreamed of an Acorn (1994)
- The Magic of Spider Woman (1996)
- Navajo Long Walk: The Tragic Story of a Proud People's Forced March from Their Homeland (2002)
- Soldier Sister, Fly Home (2016)
- The Water Lady (2021)

=== Wrote and illustrated ===
- Ma'ii and Cousin Horned Toad (1992)
- Navajo: Vision and Voices Across the Mesa (1995)
- Strawberry Pop and Soda Crackers (1997)

=== Contributed ===
- Collective Willeto: The Visionary Carvings of a Navajo Artist (2002)
