= Sara Miller McCune =

American publisher

- Born: 1941 (age 84–85); Manhattan, New York City, U.S.
- Occupations: Businesswoman, philanthropist
- Known for: Founding of Sage Publishing
- Spouse: George McCune (deceased)

Sara Miller McCune (born 1941) is an American businesswoman and philanthropist. She is the co-founder and chair emeritus of Sage (formerly SAGE Publishing).

== Early life ==
McCune was born the elder of two siblings in a middle-class Jewish family in Manhattan.

She was international president of B'nai B'rith Girls at the age of 19, and has spoken of the importance of tzedakah, a Hebrew word usually translated as "charity".

== Career ==
In 1965, McCune founded the independent academic publishing company Sage in New York City with Macmillan Publishers executive George D. McCune as a "mentor"; the name of the company is an acronym formed from the first letters of their given names. Sage relocated to Southern California in 1966, after the two married; George McCune left Macmillan to formally join Sage at that time. Sara Miller McCune remained president for 18 years, shifting to board chairman in 1984, while retaining the title of executive chairman. The couple continued to develop the company together until George McCune's death in 1990. In 2021 McCune signed over her voting shares and control of the company to the SAGE-SMM Trust, citing this as a strategy to ensure Sage remains independent.

== Philanthropy ==
McCune has funded schools in the developing world, and made contributions to California organizations and educational establishments, including $2.5 million to Santa Barbara Cottage Hospital, $3.5 million to found the SAGE Center For the Study of the Mind at UCSB, and over $5 million to the Granada Theater Restoration Project. She is also a trustee and supporter of the UCSB Foundation She founded the charitable McCune Foundation in 1990. In 2003, she received the Spirit of Entrepreneurship award at Ernst & Young Entrepreneur of the Year Awards. In 2008 Women’s Campaign International recognised her achievements at an event entitled Shattering The Glass Ceiling: Honoring Inspirational Women Around The Globe.

In 2007, McCune founded the Miller-McCune Center for Research, Media and Public Policy in Santa Barbara, California, and serves as its executive chairman. In 2008, she announced that the Center would launch Miller-McCune magazine, published in print and online, with support from Sage. On February 21, 2012 the magazine rebranded as Pacific Standard. In 2017, the magazine and the center’s mission were transferred to the newly launched Social Justice Foundation. On August 7, 2019, the editor of Pacific Standard reported that the magazine was closing, after Sage abruptly cut off funding.

In 2014, she became a member of the Visiting Committee of the Social Science Research Council, based in New York City. In 2015, she established a fund for research methods at the Council. In 2017, she joined the Council’s board of directors.

== Honors ==
In 2016, McCune received an honorary degree from California State University Channel Islands for her support for the arts, social issues and patronage and an honorary doctorate from Sussex University. She has also received honorary degrees from her alma mater, Queens College, City University of New York, and the University of Bath, and been recognized as an honorary alumna of the University of California, Santa Barbara, and an honorary fellow at both Cardiff University and Pembroke College, Oxford.

In 2014, McCune was named as one of Folio's 100 Visionaries. In 2016, McCune received the Rock Star: Lifetime Achievement Award from the Spirit of Entrepreneurship Foundation. In 2017, McCune was recognized and honored by the Association of Learned and Professional Society Publishers for her contribution to scholarly publishing. and in 2018, she was awarded the London Book Fair Lifetime Achievement Award in recognition of her 50-plus years working within the publishing industry. She was elected to the American Philosophical Society in 2018.
