= List of accolades received by Reading Rainbow =

This is a list of notable awards won by Reading Rainbow.

== Awards and nominations ==
Awards and nominations received by Reading Rainbow
Award	Year	Category	Nominee(s)	Result	Ref.
ACT Achievement Awards	1984	Children's Television	Reading Rainbow	Won	
ACT Achievement Awards	1987	Children's Television	"What Sadie Sang by Eve Rice"	Won	
ACT Achievement Awards	1988	Children's Television	Reading Rainbow	Won	
Daytime Emmy Awards	1985	Outstanding Performer in a Children's Series	LeVar Burton	Nominated	
Daytime Emmy Awards	1986	Outstanding Children's Series	Reading Rainbow	Nominated	
Daytime Emmy Awards	1986	Outstanding Performer in a Children's Series	LeVar Burton	Nominated	
Daytime Emmy Awards	1987	Outstanding Children's Series	Reading Rainbow	Nominated	
Daytime Emmy Awards	1987	Outstanding Performer in a Children's Series	LeVar Burton	Nominated	
Daytime Emmy Awards	1987	Outstanding Achievement in Single Camera Editing		Nominated	
Daytime Emmy Awards	1988	Outstanding Children's Series	Reading Rainbow	Nominated	
Daytime Emmy Awards	1988	Outstanding Performer in a Children's Series	LeVar Burton	Nominated	
Daytime Emmy Awards	1989	Outstanding Children's Series	Reading Rainbow	Nominated	
Daytime Emmy Awards	1989	Outstanding Performer in a Children's Series	LeVar Burton	Nominated	
Daytime Emmy Awards	1990	Outstanding Children's Series	Twila Liggett, Tony Buttino, Cecily Truett, Larry Lancit, Orly Berger, Jill Gluckson, Ronnie Krauss and LeVar Burton	Won	
Daytime Emmy Awards	1990	Outstanding Performer in a Children's Series	LeVar Burton	Nominated	
Daytime Emmy Awards	1990	Outstanding Directing in a Children's Series	Larry Lancit	Nominated	
Daytime Emmy Awards	1991	Outstanding Children's Series	Cecily Truett, Tony Buttino, Orly Berger, Larry Lancit, Ronnie Krauss, Twila Liggett, LeVar Burton and Jill Gluckson	Nominated	
Daytime Emmy Awards	1991	Outstanding Performer in a Children's Series	LeVar Burton	Nominated	
Daytime Emmy Awards	1991	Outstanding Writing in a Children's Series	Andrew Gutelle and Ronnie Krauss	Nominated	
Daytime Emmy Awards	1991	Outstanding Directing in a Children's Series	Larry Lancit, Hugh Martin, Ed Wiseman and Mark Mannucci	Nominated	
Daytime Emmy Awards	1991	Outstanding Videotape Editing	James C. Wright	Won	
Daytime Emmy Awards	1992	Outstanding Children's Series	Jill Gluckson, LeVar Burton, Ronnie Krauss, Tony Buttino, Orly Berger, Cecily Truett, Twila Liggett and Larry Lancit	Nominated	
Daytime Emmy Awards	1992	Outstanding Performer in a Children's Series	LeVar Burton	Nominated	
Daytime Emmy Awards	1992	Outstanding Single Camera Editing	James C. Wright	Nominated	
Daytime Emmy Awards	1992	Outstanding Directing in a Children's Series	Larry Lancit	Nominated	
Daytime Emmy Awards	1992	Outstanding Writing in a Children's Series	Andrew Gutelle, Ronnie Krauss and Jill Gluckson	Nominated	
Daytime Emmy Awards	1993	Outstanding Children's Series	Twila Liggett, Tony Buttino, Cecily Truett, Larry Lancit, Orly Berger, LeVar Burton, Ronnie Krauss, Jill Gluckson and Kathy Kinsner	Won	
Daytime Emmy Awards	1993	Outstanding Directing in a Children's Series	Ed Wiseman and Larry Lancit	Won	
Daytime Emmy Awards	1993	Outstanding Performer in a Children's Series	LeVar Burton	Nominated	
Daytime Emmy Awards	1993	Outstanding Live and Direct to Tape Sound Mixing in a Children's Series	Gary Silver and Lee Murphy	Nominated	
Daytime Emmy Awards	1993	Outstanding Single Camera Editing	James C. Wright	Nominated	
Daytime Emmy Awards	1994	Outstanding Children's Series	Jill Gluckson, Robin Fogelman, LeVar Burton, Larry Lancit, Stacey Raider, Cecily Truett, Orly Berger, Tony Buttino and Twila Liggett	Nominated	
Daytime Emmy Awards	1994	Outstanding Performer in a Children's Series	LeVar Burton	Nominated	
Daytime Emmy Awards	1994	Outstanding Directing in a Children's Series	Mark Mannucci and Ed Wiseman	Won	
Daytime Emmy Awards	1994	Outstanding Live and Direct to Tape Sound Mixing in a Children's Series		Nominated	
Daytime Emmy Awards	1994	Outstanding Achievement in Single Camera Photography		Nominated	
Daytime Emmy Awards	1995	Outstanding Children's Series	Reading Rainbow	Nominated	
Daytime Emmy Awards	1995	Outstanding Performer in a Children's Series	LeVar Burton	Nominated	
Daytime Emmy Awards	1995	Outstanding Directing in a Children's Series	Reading Rainbow	Nominated	
Daytime Emmy Awards	1995	Outstanding Live and Direct to Tape Sound Mixing in a Children's Series	Reading Rainbow	Nominated	
Daytime Emmy Awards	1995	Outstanding Makeup in a Children's Series	Reading Rainbow	Nominated	
Daytime Emmy Awards	1996	Outstanding Children's Series	Reading Rainbow	Won	
Daytime Emmy Awards	1996	Outstanding Performer in a Children's Series	LeVar Burton	Nominated	
Daytime Emmy Awards	1996	Outstanding Directing in a Children's Series	Reading Rainbow	Nominated	
Daytime Emmy Awards	1996	Outstanding Writing in a Children's Series	Reading Rainbow	Nominated	
Daytime Emmy Awards	1996	Outstanding Achievement in a Single Camera Photography	Reading Rainbow	Won	
Daytime Emmy Awards	1997	Outstanding Children's Series	Reading Rainbow	Won	
Daytime Emmy Awards	1997	Outstanding Performer in a Children's Series	LeVar Burton	Nominated	
Daytime Emmy Awards	1997	Outstanding Directing in a Children's Series	Reading Rainbow	Nominated	
Daytime Emmy Awards	1997	Outstanding Writing in a Children's Series	Reading Rainbow	Nominated	
Daytime Emmy Awards	1997	Outstanding Single Camera Photography	Reading Rainbow	Won	
Daytime Emmy Awards	1997	Outstanding Achievement in a Single Camera Photography	Reading Rainbow	Nominated	
Daytime Emmy Awards	1998	Outstanding Children's Series	Reading Rainbow	Won	
Daytime Emmy Awards	1998	Outstanding Performer in a Children's Series	LeVar Burton	Nominated	
Daytime Emmy Awards	1998	Outstanding Writing in a Children's Series	Reading Rainbow	Nominated	
Daytime Emmy Awards	1998	Outstanding Directing in a Children's Series	Larry Lancit and Ed Wiseman	Nominated	
Daytime Emmy Awards	1998	Outstanding Live and Direct to Tape Sound Mixing in a Children's Series	Reading Rainbow	Won	
Daytime Emmy Awards	1998	Outstanding Single Camera Photography	Reading Rainbow	Nominated	
Daytime Emmy Awards	1999	Outstanding Children's Series	Reading Rainbow	Nominated	
Daytime Emmy Awards	1999	Outstanding Performer in a Children's Series	LeVar Burton	Nominated	
Daytime Emmy Awards	1999	Outstanding Writing in a Children's Series	Reading Rainbow	Nominated	
Daytime Emmy Awards	1999	Outstanding Achievement in Single Camera Photography	Reading Rainbow	Nominated	
Daytime Emmy Awards	1999	Outstanding Single Camera Editing	Reading Rainbow	Nominated	
Daytime Emmy Awards	1999	Outstanding Achievement in Live and Direct to Tape Sound Mixing	Reading Rainbow	Nominated	
Daytime Emmy Awards	2001	Outstanding Children's Series	Reading Rainbow	Won	
Daytime Emmy Awards	2001	Outstanding Performer in a Children's Series	LeVar Burton; Himself	Won	
Daytime Emmy Awards	2001	Outstanding Single Camera Photography	Reading Rainbow	Won	
Daytime Emmy Awards	2001	Outstanding Directing in a Children's Series	Ed Wiseman	Nominated	
Daytime Emmy Awards	2001	Outstanding Writing in a Children's Series	Reading Rainbow	Nominated	
Daytime Emmy Awards	2002	Outstanding Children's Series	Reading Rainbow	Won	
Daytime Emmy Awards	2002	Outstanding Performer in a Children's Series	LeVar Burton; Himself	Won	
Daytime Emmy Awards	2002	Outstanding Directing in a Children's Series	Reading Rainbow	Nominated	
Daytime Emmy Awards	2002	Outstanding Writing in a Children's Series	Reading Rainbow	Nominated	
Daytime Emmy Awards	2002	Outstanding Achievement in Single Camera Photography	Reading Rainbow	Nominated	
Daytime Emmy Awards	2003	Outstanding Children's Series	Reading Rainbow	Won	
Daytime Emmy Awards	2003	Outstanding Performer in a Children's Series	LeVar Burton	Nominated	
Daytime Emmy Awards	2007	Outstanding Achievement in Live & Direct To Tape Sound Mixing:	Reading Rainbow	Nominated	
Daytime Emmy Awards	2007	Outstanding Achievement in Music Direction and Composition	Steve Horelick	Nominated	
Daytime Emmy Awards	2007	Outstanding Achievement in Sound Mixing — Live Action and Animation	Reading Rainbow	Nominated	
NAACP Image Awards	1994	Outstanding Performer in a Youth or Children's Series/Special	LeVar Burton	Won	
NAACP Image Awards	1996	Outstanding Educational/Informational Youth or Children's Series/Special	Reading Rainbow "LeVar Burton Presents: A Reading Rainbow Special"	Won	
NAACP Image Awards	1996	Outstanding Performer in a Youth or Children's Series/Special	LeVar Burton	Won	
NAACP Image Awards	1997	Outstanding Youth or Children's Series/Special	Reading Rainbow	Nominated	
NAACP Image Awards	1998	Outstanding Youth or Children's Series/Special	Reading Rainbow	Nominated	
NAACP Image Awards	1998	Outstanding Performance in a Youth or Children's Series/Special	LeVar Burton	Nominated	
NAACP Image Awards	1999	Outstanding Youth or Children's Series/Special	Reading Rainbow	Nominated	
NAACP Image Awards	1999	Outstanding Performance in a Youth or Children's Series/Special	LeVar Burton	Won	
NAACP Image Awards	2001	Outstanding Youth or Children's Series/Special	Reading Rainbow	Nominated	
NAACP Image Awards	2001	Outstanding Performance in a Youth or Children's Series/Special	LeVar Burton	Nominated	
NAACP Image Awards	2002	Outstanding Youth or Children's Series/Special	Reading Rainbow	Nominated	
NAACP Image Awards	2002	Outstanding Performance in a Youth or Children's Series/Special	LeVar Burton	Won	
NAACP Image Awards	2003	Outstanding Performance in a Youth or Children's Series/Special	LeVar Burton	Won	
NAACP Image Awards	2005	Outstanding Performance in a Youth or Children's Series/Special	LeVar Burton	Nominated	
Monitor Awards	1983	Best Photography and Lighting; Best Editing; Best Overall Program	Reading Rainbow "Tight Times"	Won	
Monitor Awards	1984	Best Broadcast Entertainment	Reading Rainbow "Arthur's Eyes"	Won	
Peabody Awards	1992	—	Reading Rainbow (episode "The Wall")	Won	
Primetime Emmy Awards	1985	Outstanding Children's Program	Reading Rainbow	Nominated	
Primetime Emmy Awards	1996	Outstanding Children's Program	Reading Rainbow "Act Against Violence"	Nominated	
Television Critics Association Awards	2003	Outstanding Achievement in Youth Programming	Reading Rainbow	Won	
Television Critics Association Awards	2003	Heritage Award	Reading Rainbow	Nominated	
