= Carolyn Crimi =

Author of children's picture books

Carolyn Crimi (born 1959) is an American author of children's picture books.

== Biography ==
Crimi was born in 1959, in Long Island, New York. After graduating from the Berkshire School, she attended Lake Forest College, where she earned a bachelor of arts in art history in 1982. She then attended Vermont College, where she earned a master of fine arts in writing for children in 2000. She lives in Evanston, Illinois. In addition to her writing career, she also teaches courses on writing for children. She is a member of the Illinois chapter of the Society of Children's Book Writers and Illustrators.

Her book Don't Need Friends (Doubleday, 1999) received a starred review from Publishers Weekly that said, "Crimi's tight, deft prose mines Dog and Rat's petulance for all its comedy and poignancy".

In a starred review, Kirkus Reviews called There Might Be Lobsters (Candlewick, 2017) "just beachy," saying, "Sly inclusions of lobsters in the details, in particular, will provoke readers’ laughter as they cheer on Sukie and applaud Eleanor's pluck and patience".

== Awards ==
- Best of the Best selection, Chicago Public Library, 1999, for Don't Need Friends
- Kentucky Bluegrass Award for Best Picture Book, 2001, for Don't Need Friends
- Midland Author's Best Children's Fiction award runner-up for Don't Need Friends
- Arkansas Diamond Primary Book Award, 2005, for Henry and the Buccaneer Bunnies
- Armadillo Reader's Choice award, 2005, for Henry and the Buccaneer Bunnies
- Read-Aloud Books Too Good to Miss selection, 2005, for Henry and the Buccaneer Bunnies
- Association for Indiana Media Educators, 2005, for Henry and the Buccaneer Bunnies

== Selected works ==
- Outside, Inside. Illustrated by Linnea Asplind. Riley, Simon & Schuster, 1995.
- Don't Need Friends. Illustrated by Lynn Munsinger. Doubleday, 1999.
- Tessa's Tip-Tapping Toes. Illustrated by Marsha Gray Carrington. Scholastic, 2002.
- Get Busy, Beaver! Illustrated by Janie Bynum. Orchard, 2004.
- Boris and Bella. Illustrated by Gris Grimly. Harcourt, 2004.
- Henry and the Buccaneer Bunnies. Illustrated by John Manders. Candlewick, 2005.
- The Louds Move In! Illustrated by Regan Dunnick. Marshall Cavendish, 2006.
- Where's My Mummy? Illustrated by John Manders, Candlewick Press, 2008.
- Henry and the Crazed Chicken Pirates. Illustrated by John Manders. Candlewick Press, 2009.
- Dear Tabby. Illustrated by David Roberts. HarperCollinsPublishers, 2010.
- Principal Fred Won't Go to Bed. Illustrated by Donald Wu. Marshall Cavendish, 2010.
- Rock 'N' Roll Mole. Illustrated by Lynn Munsinger. Dial Books, 2011.
- Pugs in a Bug. Illustrated by Stephanie Buscema. Dial Books, 2012.
- There Might Be Lobsters. Illustrated by Laurel Molk. Candlewick, 2017.
- Weird Little Robots. Illustrated by Corinna Luyken. Candlewick, 2019.
- Secondhand Dogs. Illustrated by Melissa Manwill. Balzer + Bray/HarperCollins, 2021.
- How to Haunt a House. Illustrated by Edward Miller. Whitman, 2021.
