= Bruce Bliven =

American journalist, writer, and editor of periodicals (1889–1977)

- Bliven in January 1925.
- Born: Bruce Ormsby Bliven; July 27, 1889; Emmetsburg, Iowa, U.S.
- Died: May 27, 1977 (aged 87); Palo Alto, California, U.S.
- Occupations: Journalist; editor; author
- Employers: The New York Globe; The New Republic; The Guardian; Stanford University
- Known for: Editor of The New Republic
- Children: 1
- Parents: Charles Bliven; Lilla Ormsby Bliven

Bruce Ormsby Bliven (July 27, 1889 – May 27, 1977) was an American writer, journalist, and editor for The New Republic.

== Biography ==
Bruce Ormsby Bliven was born in Emmetsburg, Iowa, on July 27, 1889, the son of Charles and Ulla Ormsby Bliven. During his childhood, he learned journalism, winning contests in Woman's Home Companion and Success. He also began writing articles for newspapers during his time at college.

In 1919, Bliven joined The New York Globe as an editorial writer. The next year, he became the newspaper's managing editor. By the time he had left the Globe in 1923, Bliven was the newspaper's assistant editor. After leaving the Globe, Bliven joined The New Republic as a managing editor. He became the magazine's editor in 1930, not leaving it until 1953. Additionally, from 1925 to 1947, Bliven was the New York correspondent for The Guardian, In 1956, Bliven became a lecturer of communications at Stanford University, a position he held until a few years before his death. He released his autobiography, Five Million Words Later, in 1970.

Bliven died in the Stanford University Medical Center in Palo Alto, California on May 27, 1977 at the age of 87. He had been hospitalized for three weeks due to a hip fracture from falling on his lawn.

== Works ==
- Five Million Words Later (1970)
