= Laurel Molk =

Author and illustrator

- Citizenship: USA
- Education: Rhode Island School of Design
- Occupations: Illustrator; Author
- Writing career
- Genre: Children's literature
- Notable works: Good Job, Oliver (1999); There Might Be Lobsters (2017); Knitting for Dogs (2022)
- Website: laurelmolk.com

Laurel Molk is an illustrator and author of children's books.

== Career ==
Molk attended the Rhode Island School of Design. She lives in the Boston area.

Molk has published several books as author and illustrator and more as the illustrator of books by other authors, including Jane Yolen and Alice B. McGinty.

Her illustrations for Yolen's Beneath the Ghost Moon (Little, Brown & Company, 1994) were praised in a Publishers Weekly review: "Molk's careful, cool-hued watercolors depict a well-appointed farm house and an endearing cast of gentle-eyed mice".

Publishers Weekly wrote that the text of Good Job, Oliver (Knopf, 1999) "cheerily conveys several important messages, including the value of self-confidence and conviction". Kirkus Reviews wrote positively of the book: "While Molk’s storytelling is entertaining, her watercolors steal the show. Her inventive use of the page makes the book practically boundless".

Publishers Weekly said about When You Were Just a Heartbeat (Little, Brown, 2004): "Molk certainly sends a heartfelt message to young listeners," but "the book may be too esoteric and its illustrations too quiet to capture—and keep—children's attention". About the same book, Kirkus Reviews said, "Placed on broad expanses of white, each portrait will draw the eyes even of very young viewers".

A reviewer for School Library Journal called Eeny, Meeny, Miney, Mo, and Flo! (Viking, 2015) "the perfect combination of text and illustration creates a fun choice for storytime or one-on-one reading". Kirkus Reviews called it "brisk and bouncy," and noted, "using a different, handwritten-style type for the dialogue keeps things clear, though read-alouds could still be a bit tricky".

There Might Be Lobsters (Candlewick, 2017) received a starred review from Kirkus Reviews. "There’s ample humor in the watercolor, acrylic, and ink illustrations and heaping doses of compassion, too".

Molk's Knitting for Dogs (Random House Studio, 2022) was reviewed by Publishers Weekly as "Molk... demystifies the problem-solving process with measured storytelling, wry images, and a cool but approachable protagonist, acknowledging both the frustrations of hitting a metaphoric wall and the joys of discovering new depths of personal ingenuity".

== Selected works ==
=== As author and illustrator ===
- Good Job, Oliver. Alfred A. Knopf Books for Young Readers, 1999.
- When You Were Just a Heartbeat. Little, Brown, 2004.
- Eeny, Meeny, Miney, Mo, and Flo! Viking, 2015.
- Knitting for Dogs. Random House Studio, 2022.

=== As illustrator ===
- On the Farm. Edited by Lee Bennett Hopkins. Little, Brown, 1991.
- Beneath the Ghost Moon. Written by Jane Yolen. Little, Brown and Company, 1994.
- Off We Go. Written by Jane Yolen. Little, Brown Books for Young Readers, 2002.
- It's a... It's a... It's a Mitzvah. Written by Liz Suneby & Diane Heiman. Jewish Lights Publishing, 2012.
- Take Your Time: A Tale of Harriet, the Galápagos Tortoise. Written by Eva Furrow & Donna Jo Napoli. Henry Holt, 2017.
- There Might Be Lobsters. Written by Carolyn Crimi. Candlewick, 2017.
- No Room for a Pup. Written by Elizabeth Suneby. Kids Can, 2019.
- A Synagogue Just Like Home. Written by Alice Blumenthal McGinty. Candlewick Press, 2022.
