= The New Republic =

American magazine

- Cover of the issue from February 11, 2013, featuring Barack Obama
- Editor-in-chief: Win McCormack
- Editor: Michael Tomasky
- Categories: Editorial magazine
- Frequency: 10 per year
- Publisher: Michael Caruso
- First issue: November 7, 1914; 111 years ago
- Country: United States
- Based in: Washington, D.C. (editorial), New York City (operations)
- Language: English
- Website: newrepublic.com
- ISSN: 0028-6583 (print); 2169-2416 (web)
- OCLC: 1759945

The New Republic (often abbreviated as TNR) is an American magazine focused on domestic politics, news, culture, and the arts. It publishes 10 print magazines per year and a daily online platform. The New York Times described the magazine as partially founded in Theodore Roosevelt's living room and known for its "intellectual rigor and left-leaning political views".

== History ==
=== 1914–1974: Early years ===
Founded in 1914 by several leaders of the progressive movement, it attempted to find a balance between "a liberalism centered in humanitarian and moral passion and one based in an ethos of scientific analysis".

The New Republic was founded by Herbert Croly, Walter Lippmann, and Walter Weyl. They gained the financial backing of heiress Dorothy Payne Whitney and her husband, Willard Straight, who eventually became the majority owner. The magazine's first issue was published on November 7, 1914. The magazine's politics were liberal and progressive, and as such concerned with coping with the great changes brought about by middle-class reform efforts designed to remedy perceived weaknesses in America's changing economy and society. The magazine is widely considered important in changing the character of liberalism in the direction of governmental interventionism, both foreign and domestic. The most important of the perceived changes was the emergence of the U.S. as a great power on the international scene. In 1917, TNR urged America's entry into World War I on the side of the Allies.

Even before the U.S. entered the war, the Russian Revolution had started in March 1917. During the interwar years, the magazine was generally positive in its assessment of the Soviet Union (founded in 1922) and of Joseph Stalin. TNR changed its position after the Cold War began in 1947, and in 1948, its leftist editor, the former Vice President of the United States Henry A. Wallace, departed to run for president on the Progressive ticket. After Wallace, the magazine moved toward positions more typical of mainstream American liberalism. Throughout the 1950s, the publication was critical both of Soviet foreign policy and of domestic anticommunism, particularly McCarthyism. During the 1960s, the magazine opposed the Vietnam War, but also often criticized the New Left.

Until the late 1960s, the magazine had a certain "cachet as the voice of re-invigorated liberalism", in the opinion of the commentator Eric Alterman, who has criticized the magazine's politics from the left. That cachet, Alterman wrote, "was perhaps best illustrated when the dashing, young President Kennedy had been photographed boarding Air Force One holding a copy".

=== 1974–1979: Peretz ownership and eventual editorship ===
In March 1974, the magazine was purchased for $380,000 by Martin Peretz, a lecturer at Harvard University, from Gilbert A. Harrison. Peretz was a veteran of the New Left, but had broken with the movement over its support of various Third World liberationist movements, particularly the Palestine Liberation Organization. Harrison continued editing the magazine and expected Peretz to let him continue running the magazine for three years. However, by 1975, when Peretz became annoyed at having his own articles rejected for publication while he was pouring money into the magazine to cover its losses, he fired Harrison. Much of the staff, including Walter Pincus, Stanley Karnow, and Doris Grumbach, were fired or quit and were replaced largely by recent Harvard graduates, who lacked journalistic experience. Peretz became the editor and served in that post until 1979. In 1980, the magazine endorsed the moderate Republican John B. Anderson, who ran as an independent, rather than the Democratic incumbent Jimmy Carter. As other editors were appointed, Peretz remained editor-in-chief until 2012.

=== 1979–1991: Kinsley and Hertzberg editorships ===
Michael Kinsley was editor (1979–1981, 1985–1989), alternating twice with the more leftleaning Hendrik Hertzberg (1981–1985, 1989–1991). Kinsley was only 28 years old when he first became editor and was still attending law school.

Writers for the magazine during this era included neoliberals Mickey Kaus and Jacob Weisberg, along with Charles Krauthammer, Fred Barnes, Morton Kondracke, Sidney Blumenthal, Robert Kuttner, Ronald Steel, Michael Walzer, and Irving Howe.

It was widely considered a "must read" across the political spectrum. An article in Vanity Fair called it "the smartest, most impudent weekly in the country" and the "most entertaining and intellectually agile magazine in the country." According to Alterman, the magazine's prose could sparkle and the contrasting views in its pages were "genuinely exciting." He added, "The magazine unarguably set the terms of debate for insider political elites during the Reagan era."

The magazine won the respect of many conservative opinion leaders. Twenty copies were sent by messenger to the Reagan White House each Thursday afternoon. Norman Podhoretz called the magazine "indispensable, " and George Will called it "currently the nation's most interesting and most important political journal." National Review described it as "one of the most interesting magazines in the United States."

Credit for its influence was often attributed to Kinsley, whose wit and critical sensibility were seen as enlivening, and Hertzberg, a writer for The New Yorker and speechwriter for Jimmy Carter.

Hertzberg and Kinsley alternated as editor and as the author of the magazine's lead column, "TRB from Washington." Its perspective was described as center-left in 1988.

A final ingredient that led to the magazine's increased stature in the 1980s was its "back of the book" or literary, cultural and arts pages, which were edited by Leon Wieseltier. Peretz discovered Wieseltier, then working at Harvard's Society of Fellows, and put him in charge of the section. Wieseltier reinvented the section along the lines of The New York Review of Books and allowed his critics, many of them academics, to write longer, critical essays instead of simple book reviews. Alterman calls the selection of Wieseltier "probably... Peretz's single most significant positive achievement" in running the magazine. Despite changes of other editors, Wieseltier remained as cultural editor. Under him the section was "simultaneously erudite and zestful," according to Alterman."

=== 1991–1996: Sullivan editorship ===
After becoming editor in 1991, Andrew Sullivan took the magazine in a somewhat more conservative direction, but the majority of writers remained liberal or neoliberal. Hertzberg soon left the magazine to return to The New Yorker. Kinsley left the magazine in 1996 to found the online magazine Slate.

In 1994, Sullivan invited Charles Murray to contribute a 10,000-word article excerpted from his coauthored book The Bell Curve. The article, which contended that "African Americans score differently from whites on standardized tests of cognitive ability," proved to be very controversial and was published in a special issue together with many responses and critiques. The magazine also published a very critical article by Elizabeth McCaughey about the Clinton administration's 1993 health care plan. Alterman described the article as "dishonest, misinformed," and "the single most influential article published in the magazine during the entire Clinton presidency. James Fallows of The Atlantic noted the article's inaccuracies and said, "The White House issued a point-by-point rebuttal, which The New Republic did not run. Instead it published a long piece by McCaughey attacking the White House statement." Sullivan also published a number of pieces by Camille Paglia.

Ruth Shalit, a young writer for the magazine in the Sullivan years, was repeatedly criticized for plagiarism. Afterwards, the magazine began using fact-checkers during Sullivan's time as editor, such as Stephen Glass. When later working as a reporter, Glass was later found to have fabricated quotes, anecdotes, and facts in his own articles.

=== 1996–2007: Kelly, Lane, Beinart, Foer, Just editorships ===
After Sullivan stepped down in 1996, David Greenberg and Peter Beinart served jointly as acting editors. After the 1996 presidential election, Michael Kelly served as editor for a year. During his tenure as editor and afterward, Kelly, who also wrote the TRB column, was intensely critical of Clinton.

Chuck Lane held the editor's position between 1997 and 1999. During Lane's tenure, the Stephen Glass scandal occurred. Glass, who had been a major contributing writer under Kelly's editorship, was later shown to have falsified and fabricated numerous stories, which was admitted by The New Republic after an investigation by Kelly's successor, Charles Lane. Kelly had consistently supported Glass during his tenure, including sending scathing letters to those challenging the veracity of Glass's stories. The events were later dramatized in the feature film Shattered Glass, adapted from a 1998 report by H.G. Bissinger. Peretz has written that Lane ultimately "put the ship back on its course," for which Peretz said he was "immensely grateful." Lane resigned after he learned that Peretz intended to replace him.

Peter Beinart, a third editor who took over when he was 28 years old, followed Lane. He served as editor from 1999 to 2006.

In the early 2000s, the TNR added Buzz weblogs &c., Iraq'd, and Easterblogg, replaced in 2005 with the sole blog The Plank. The Stump was added in 2007 and covered the 2008 presidential election.

The magazine remained well known, with references to it occasionally appearing in popular culture. Lisa Simpson was once portrayed as a subscriber to The New Republic for Kids. Matt Groening, the creator of The Simpsons, once drew a cover for The New Republic. In the pilot episode of the HBO series Entourage, Ari Gold asks Eric Murphy, "Do you read The New Republic? Well, I do, and it says that you don't know what the fuck you're talking about."

Franklin Foer took over from Beinart in March 2006. The magazine's first editorial under Foer said, "We've become more liberal.... We've been encouraging Democrats to dream big again on the environment and economics...." Other prominent writers who edited or wrote for the magazine in those years include senior editor and columnist Jonathan Chait, Lawrence F. Kaplan, John Judis and Spencer Ackerman.

In 2006, longtime contributor, critic, and senior editor Lee Siegel, who had maintained a blog on the TNR site dedicated primarily to art and culture, was revealed by an investigation to have collaborated in posting comments to his own blog under an alias aggressively praising Siegel, attacking his critics and claiming not to be Siegel when challenged by an anonymous detractor on his blog. The blog was removed from the website and Siegel was suspended from writing for the print magazine. He resumed writing for TNR in April 2007.

=== Political and foreign policy stances under Peretz ===
The New Republic gradually became much less left-wing under Peretz, which culminated in the editorship of the conservative Andrew Sullivan. The magazine was associated with the Democratic Leadership Council (DLC) and "New Democrats", such as Bill Clinton and Joseph Lieberman, who received the magazine's endorsement in the 2004 Democratic primary.

In the 21st century, the magazine gradually shifted left but was still more moderate and hawkish than conventional liberal periodicals. Policies supported by both The New Republic and the DLC in the 1990s were increased funding for the Earned Income Tax Credit program, the reform of the federal welfare system, and supply-side economics, especially the idea of reducing higher marginal income tax rates, which in the later Peretz years received heavy criticism from senior editor Jonathan Chait.

The New Republic's support for Israel, including the state's conservative right-wing or Likud Party stances, was a strong theme of the magazine from the beginning: "Support for Israel is deep down an expression of America's best view of itself." According to journalism professor Eric Alterman:

Nothing has been as consistent about the past 34 years of The New Republic as the magazine's devotion to Peretz's own understanding of what is good for Israel.... It is really not too much to say that almost all of Peretz's political beliefs are subordinate to his commitment to Israel's best interests, and these interests as Peretz defines them almost always involve more war.

Unsigned editorials prior to the 2003 invasion of Iraq expressed strong support for military action and cited the threat of facilities for weapons of mass destruction, as well as humanitarian concerns. In the first years of the Iraq War, editorials were critical of the handling of the war, but continued to justify the invasion on humanitarian grounds even though they no longer maintained that Iraq's weapons of mass destruction posed any threat to the United States. In the issue from November 27, 2006, the editors wrote:

At this point, it seems almost beside the point to say this: The New Republic deeply regrets its early support for this war. The past three years have complicated our idealism and reminded us of the limits of American power and our own wisdom.

=== 2007–2012: Sale to CanWest, buyback and new format ===
Until February 2007, The New Republic was owned by Martin Peretz, New York financiers Roger Hertog and Michael Steinhardt, and Canadian media conglomerate CanWest. In late February 2007, Peretz sold his share of the magazine to CanWest, which announced that its subsidiary CanWest Media Works International had acquired a full interest in the publication. Peretz retained his position as editor-in-chief.

Starting on March 19, 2007, the magazine went to publishing twice a month, or 24 times a year. This replaced the old plan of publishing 44 issues a year. The magazine described its publication schedule as "biweekly," with specified "skipped publication dates." There were ten of these in 2010. Issues became bigger, contained more pages, and featured more visuals, new art and other "reader-friendly" content. The use of the Warnock typeface throughout was accented by woodcut-style illustrations. Although the subscription prices did not change, the newsstand price increased from $3.95 to $4.95. The website was also redesigned, and offered more daily content and new features.

In March 2009, Peretz and a group of investors, led by former Lazard executive Laurence Grafstein and including Michael Alter, bought the magazine back from CanWest, which was on the edge of bankruptcy. Frank Foer continued as editor and was responsible for the day-to-day management of the magazine, and Peretz remained editor-in-chief. Richard Just took over as editor of the magazine on December 8, 2010.

=== 2012–2016: Chris Hughes ownership and editorial crisis ===
On March 9, 2012, Facebook co-founder Chris Hughes was introduced as the New Republic's majority owner and editor-in-chief. Under Hughes, the magazine became less focused on "The Beltway," with more cultural coverage and attention to visuals. It stopped running an editorial in every issue. Media observers noted a less uniformly pro-Israel tone in the magazine's coverage than its editorial stance during Peretz's ownership. On December 4, 2014, Gabriel Snyder, previously of Gawker and Bloomberg, replaced Franklin Foer as editor. The magazine was reduced from twenty issues per year to ten and the editorial offices moved from Penn Quarter, Washington D.C., to New York, where it was reinvented as a "vertically integrated digital-media company." The changes provoked a major crisis among the publication's editorial staff and contributing editors. The magazine's literary editor, Leon Wieseltier, resigned in protest. Subsequent days brought many more resignations, including those of executive editors Rachel Morris and Greg Veis; nine of the magazine's eleven active senior writers; legal-affairs editor Jeffrey Rosen; the digital-media editor; six culture writers and editors; and thirty-six out of thirty-eight contributing editors (including Paul Berman, Jonathan Chait, William Deresiewicz, Ruth Franklin, Anthony Grafton, Enrique Krauze, Ryan Lizza, Sacha Z. Scoblic, Helen Vendler, Sean Wilentz). In all, two-thirds of the names on the editorial masthead were gone.

The mass resignations forced the magazine to suspend its December 2014 edition. Previously a weekly for most of its history, it was immediately before suspension published ten times per year with a circulation of approximately 50,000. The company went back to publishing twenty issues a year, and editor Gabriel Snyder worked with staff to reshape it.

In the wake of the editorial crisis, Hughes indicated that he intended to stay with The New Republic over the long term, telling NPR of his desire to make sure the magazine could produce quality journalism "hopefully for decades to come." He published an open letter about his "commitment" to give the magazine "a new mandate for a new century." However, on January 11, 2016, Hughes put The New Republic up for sale. In another open letter, he said, "After investing a great deal of time, energy, and over $20 million, I have come to the conclusion that it is time for new leadership and vision at The New Republic."

=== Since 2016: Win McCormack ownership ===
In February 2016, Win McCormack bought the magazine from Hughes, and named Eric Bates, the former executive editor of Rolling Stone, as editor. In September 2017, Bates was demoted from his leadership role to a masthead title of "editor at large." J.J. Gould, coming from The Atlantic, then served as editor for just over a year, before resigning in December 2018. In November 2017, Hamilton Fish V, the publisher since McCormack's acquisition of the magazine, resigned amid allegations of workplace misconduct. Kerrie Gillis was named publisher in February 2019, and Chris Lehmann, formerly the editor in chief of The Baffler, was named editor April 9, 2019. Within months his management style faced public criticism for his hiring process of an Inequality Editor, posted on June 28. Within weeks, another scandal erupted, with Lehmann facing even harsher criticism from the public and the media for his decision to publish a controversial op-ed by Dale Peck called "My Mayor Pete Problem." The op-ed was retracted, with Lehmann commenting in a separate statement: "The New Republic recognizes that this post crossed a line, and while it was largely intended as satire, it was inappropriate and invasive." In March 2021, it was announced that Lehmann would be departing his role as editor and would be replaced by Michael Tomasky.

== Circulation ==
=== Print circulation in the 2000s ===
The New Republic's average paid circulation for 2009 was 53,485 copies per issue.

The New Republic average monthly paid circulation
Year	Avg. Paid Circ.	% Change
2000	101,651	
2001	88,409	−13.0
2002	85,069	−3.8
2003	63,139	−25.8
2004	61,675	−2.3
2005	61,771	+0.2
2006	61,024	−1.2
2007	59,779	−2.0
2008	65,162	+9.0
2009	53,485	−18.0
2010	NR	NR

The New Republic's last reported circulation numbers to media auditor BPA Worldwide were for the six months ending on June 30, 2009.

=== Online ===
According to Quantcast, the TNR website received roughly 120,000 visitors in April 2008, and 962,000 visitors in April 2012. By June 9, 2012, the TNR website's monthly page visits dropped to 421,000 in the U.S. and 521,000 globally. As of April 16, 2014, the TNR website's Quantcast webpage contains the following messages: "This publisher has not implemented Quantcast Measurement. Data is estimated and not verified by Quantcast...," and "We do not have enough information to provide a traffic estimate...," and "Traffic data unavailable until this site becomes quantified." Demographically, data show that visitors tend to be well educated (76% being college graduates, with 33% having a graduate degree), relatively affluent (55% having a household income of over $60,000 and 31% having a six figure income), white (83%), and more likely to be male (61%). Eighty two percent were at least 35 years old with 38% being over the age of 50.

== Controversies ==
=== Michael Straight ===
New Republic editor Michael Whitney Straight (1948 to 1956) was later discovered to be a spy for the KGB, recruited into the same network as Donald Maclean, Guy Burgess, Kim Philby, and Anthony Blunt. Straight's espionage activities began at Cambridge during the 1930s; he later claimed that they ceased during World War II. Later, shortly before serving in the Kennedy administration, he revealed his past ties and turned in fellow spy Anthony Blunt. In return for his cooperation, his own involvement was kept secret and he continued to serve in various capacities for the U.S. government until he retired. Straight admitted his involvement in his memoirs; however, subsequent documents obtained from the former KGB after the fall of the Soviet Union indicated that he drastically understated the extent of his espionage activities.

=== Spencer Ackerman ===
In 2006, associate editor Spencer Ackerman was fired by editor Franklin Foer. Describing it as a "painful" decision, Foer attributed the firing to Ackerman's "insubordination": disparaging the magazine on his personal blog, saying that he would "skullfuck" a terrorist's corpse at an editorial meeting if that was required to "establish his anti-terrorist bona fides" and sending Foer an e-mail where he said—in what according to Ackerman was intended to be a joke—he would "make a niche in your skull" with a baseball bat. Ackerman, by contrast, argued that the dismissal was due to "irreconcilable ideological differences." He believed that his leftward drift (a result of the Iraq War and the actions of the Bush administration) was not appreciated by the senior editorial staff. Within 24 hours of being fired by The New Republic, Ackerman was hired as a senior correspondent for the rival magazine The American Prospect.

=== Scott Thomas Beauchamp controversy ===
In July 2007, after The New Republic published an article by an American soldier in Iraq titled "Shock Troops", allegations of inadequate fact-checking were leveled against the magazine. Critics alleged that the piece contained inconsistent details indicative of fabrication. The identity of the anonymous soldier, Scott Thomas Beauchamp, was revealed. Beauchamp was married to Elspeth Reeve, one of the magazine's three fact-checkers. As a result of the controversy, The New Republic and the United States Army launched investigations, reaching different conclusions. In an article titled "The Fog of War", published on December 1, 2007, Franklin Foer wrote that the magazine could no longer stand behind the stories written by Beauchamp.

=== Pete Buttigieg article ===
On July 12, 2019, gay writer Dale Peck wrote an article for The New Republic critical of Pete Buttigieg, a 2020 Democratic Party presidential primary candidate. Peck repeatedly referred to Buttigieg as "Mary Pete", which he described as the "gay equivalent of Uncle Tom", saying, "Pete and I are just not the same kind of gay." He went on to describe the candidate as a "fifteen-year-old boy in a Chicago bus station wondering if it's a good idea to go home with a fifty-year-old man so that he'll finally understand what he is." The piece was harshly received by several media figures.

== Editors ==
1. Herbert Croly (1914–1930)
2. Bruce Bliven (1930–1946)
3. Henry A. Wallace (1946–1948)
4. Michael Straight (1948–1956)
5. Gilbert A. Harrison (1956–1975)
6. Martin Peretz (1975–1979)
7. Michael Kinsley (1979–1981; 1985–1989)
8. Hendrik Hertzberg (1981–1985; 1989–1991)
9. Andrew Sullivan (1991–1996)
10. Michael Kelly (1996–1997)
11. Charles Lane (1997–1999)
12. Peter Beinart (1999–2006)
13. Franklin Foer (2006–2010; 2012–2014)
14. Richard Just (2010–2012)
15. Gabriel Snyder (2014–2016)
16. Eric Bates (2016–2017)
17. J.J. Gould (2017–2018)
18. Chris Lehmann (2019–2021)
19. Michael Tomasky (since 2021)

Before Wallace's appointment in 1946, the masthead listed no single editor in charge, but gave an editorial board of four to eight members. Walter Lippmann, Edmund Wilson, and Robert Morss Lovett, among others, served on this board at various times. The names given above are the first editor listed in each issue, always the senior editor of the team.

== Notable contributors ==
=== 1910s–1940s ===
- Eugene Szekeres Bagger, author and essayist
- Ralph Bates, English writer and political activist
- John Dewey, essayist and philosopher
- W. E. B. Du Bois, writer, professor and sociologist
- Otis Ferguson, film critic
- John T. Flynn, essayist and New Deal critic
- Learned Hand, Judge
- John Maynard Keynes, economist
- Clara Littledale, writer on home and family life
- George Henry Soule Jr., labor economist
- Agnes de Lima, lead writer on education
- Thomas Mann, "Letter to Alexey Tolstoy (sent to Russia through Russian War Relief Inc.)" (1943)
- George Orwell, author and essayist
- M. E. Ravage, journalist, essayist, biographer
- Virginia Woolf, author and essayist
- Edmund Wilson, assistant book reviewer

=== 1943–1983 ===
- John Beecher, contributing writer
- Richard Strout, correspondent, The Christian Science Monitor, "TRB From Washington"
- Stark Young, drama critic, scholar, novelist, painter, contributing writer.

=== 1950s–1970s ===
- Stanley Kauffmann, film critic (1958–2013)
- Reinhold Niebuhr, theologian
- John F. Osborne, contributing writer and editor
- L. Fletcher Prouty, former Chief of Special Operations for the Joint Chiefs of Staff
- Roger Rosenblatt
- Philip Roth, author
- Judd L. Teller, author, editor, poet
- Philip Terzian, author/editor

=== 1980s–1990s ===
- Fred Barnes
- Eric Breindel
- Jeane Kirkpatrick
- Jacob Heilbrunn
- Irving Howe
- Robert Kagan
- Morton Kondracke
- Charles Krauthammer
- Irving Kristol
- Edward Luttwak
- Michael Ledeen
- Joshua Muravchik
- Ronald Radosh

=== Since the 1990s ===
- Fouad Ajami, professor of Middle East Studies at Johns Hopkins University
- Scott Thomas Beauchamp, freelance writer, soldier
- Paul Berman, essayist, author
- Simon Blackburn, English philosopher
- Alan Brinkley, historian
- Jonathan Chait, senior editor
- Jonathan Cohn, senior editor
- Jerry Coyne, evolutionary biologist
- Michael Crowley, senior editor
- E. J. Dionne Jr., journalist
- Barbara Ehrenreich, journalist
- Niall Ferguson, historian
- William Galston, political philosopher
- Stephen Glass, reporter fired by TNR for submitting fabricated stories, dramatized in the 2003 film Shattered Glass
- J.J. Gould, Canadian-American journalist
- David Grann, senior editor
- Melissa Gira Grant, writer
- David Greenberg, historian and journalist
- Blaine Greteman, professor at University of Iowa
- Matt Groening, illustrator and The Simpsons creator
- Jacob Hacker, political scientist
- Johann Hari, British writer
- David Hazony, Israeli writer
- Jeet Heer, Canadian writer
- Julia Ioffe (born 1982), Russian-born American journalist
- John Judis, essayist
- Tony Judt, historian
- Jo Livingstone, culture staff writer
- Suki Kim, contributing editor
- Adam Kirsch, poet and critic
- Alvaro Vargas Llosa, writer
- John McWhorter, linguist and political commentator
- Dana Milbank, senior editor
- Sherwin B. Nuland, medical doctor and author
- Michael Oren, historian and author
- Camille Paglia, essayist
- Alex Pareene, former editor-in-chief of Gawker
- Dale Peck, literary reviewer
- George Pelecanos, author
- Caryl Phillips, writer
- Steven Pinker, cognitive linguist and Harvard professor
- David Plotz, editor of Slate
- Richard Rorty, philosopher
- Richard Posner, federal judge
- Hanna Rosin, senior editor
- Noam Scheiber, senior editor
- Amartya Sen, economist
- Alex Shephard, news editor
- Lee Siegel, cultural critic
- Zadie Smith, writer
- Joseph Stiglitz, economist
- Richard Taruskin, musicologist
- Helen Vendler, literary critic
- Michael Walzer, philosopher, essayist, author
- Alan Wolfe, political scientist/ sociologist
- Gordon S. Wood, historian
- James Wood, English literary critic
- Robert Wright, journalist; former TNR senior editor and columnist
