= Elizabeth Suneby =

Jewish children's book author

Elizabeth "Liz" Suneby is a children's book author.

== Biography ==
Suneby earned a bachelor of arts degree from Brown University.

She is Jewish and has written several mitzvah-themed books.

Suneby is known for her nonfiction picture book Razia's Ray of Hope (Kids Can Press, 2013), about Razia Jan. The book came to the attention of Roya Hosseini and was then used as part of curriculum of the Khaled Hosseini Foundation. Razia's Ray of Hope was a Jane Addams Children's Book Award Honor Title in 2014.

Iqbal and His Ingenious Idea: How a Science Project Helps One Family and the Planet (Kids Can Press, 2018) won the American Association for the Advancement of Science/Subaru SB&F Prize for Excellence in Science Books in 2019.

Suneby has worked with the United Nations' Clean Cooking Alliance.

Suneby lives in Wellesley, Massachusetts. She has a husband and two children.

== Selected works ==
- See What You Can Be: Explore Careers That Could Be for You! With Diane Heiman. American Girl Publishing, 2007.
- The Mitzvah Project Book. With Diane Heiman. Jewish Lights, 2011.
- It's a ... It's a ... It's a Mitzvah. With Diane Heiman. Illustrated by Laurel Molk. Jewish Lights, 2012.
- The JGuy's Guide: The GPS for Jewish Teen Guys. With Joseph B. Meszler, Shulamit Reinharz, and Diane Heiman. Jewish Lights, 2013.
- No Room for a Pup! Illustrated by Laurel Molk. Kids Can Press, 2019.

=== Citizen Kid series ===
- Razia's Ray of Hope: One Girl's Dream of an Education. Illustrated by Suana Verelst. Kids Can Press, 2013.
- Iqbal and His Ingenious Idea: How a Science Project Helps One Family and the Planet. Illustrated by Rebecca Green. Kids Can Press, 2018.
