= J. J. Gould =

Canadian journalist and publisher

John Jamesen Gould is a Canadian journalist, publisher, and entrepreneur. He is a former editor of The New Republic, digital editor at The Atlantic, and staff editor for the Journal of Democracy. He is the founder and editor of The Signal.
