= Razia Jan =

Afghan-American humanitarian (1944–2025)

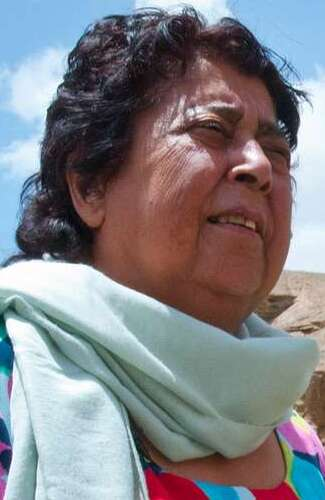
- Jan in 2012
- Born: 5 June 1944; Quetta, Baluchistan, British India (present-day Balochistan, Pakistan)
- Died: 20 July 2025 (aged 81); Los Angeles, California, U.S.
- Education: Massachusetts Institute of Technology
- Occupations: Business owner; activist; humanitarian
- Children: 1

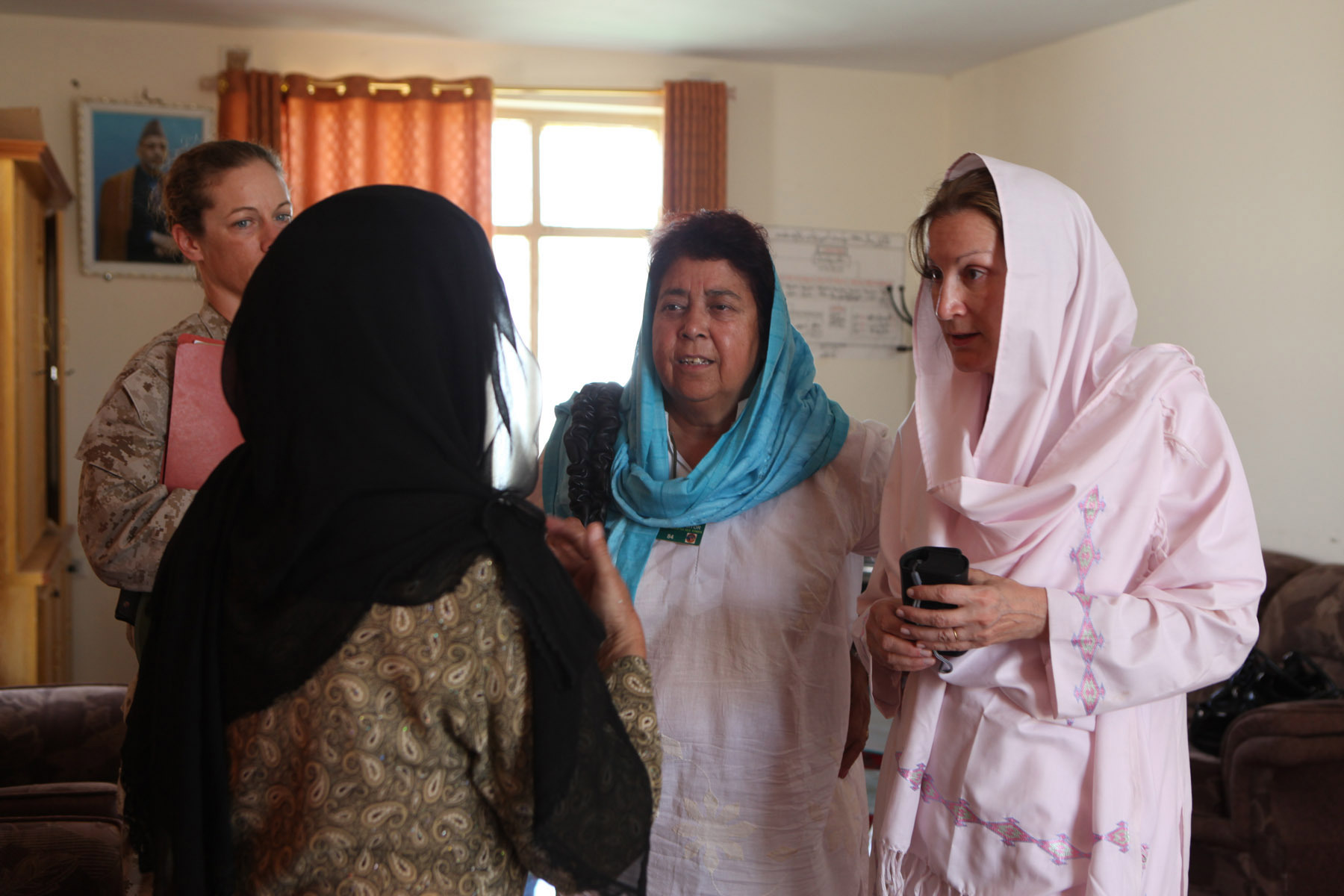
Connie Duckworth, founder of Arzu Studio Hope, and Razia Jan, founder of Razia's Ray of hope, speak with Fowzea Olemi, director of the women's center in Lashkar Gah, June 8, 2010

Razia Jan (5 June 1944 – 20 July 2025) was an Afghan-American business owner and activist who was the founder of Razia's Ray of Hope Foundation, a nonprofit education organization in Afghanistan.

== Biography ==
Jan was born in Quetta on 5 June 1944, and moved to the United States in 1970 to go to college at the Massachusetts Institute of Technology. She previously attained bachelor's and master's degrees from the Government College for Women in Quetta. The proprietor of a small tailoring business in Duxbury, Massachusetts, she served as president of the town's Rotary Club.

After the September 11 attacks, Jan rallied her New England community to send over 400 homemade blankets to rescue workers who were at Ground Zero of the attacks. Her efforts expanded to include sending care packages to US troops in Afghanistan. Through her involvement in the military's Operation Shoe Fly, she coordinated the delivery of over 30,000 pairs of shoes to needy Afghan children.

In 2008, she opened a free all girls' school in Afghanistan, the Zabuli Education Center, starting with 109 students. The school is mostly funded by private donors. A documentary was filmed about the school which aired on PBS in 2016, called What Tomorrow Brings. The money raised after the film aired helped build a new building, the Razia Jan Institute for Medical Sciences, which was a free two-year midwifery certification college. The first students graduated in 2019.

In 2021 the organisation served 800 students, but then was forced to shut under the new Taliban regime following the 2021 Taliban offensive. The school was allowed to re-open for primary school students, but was forced to stop educating secondary students. The midwifery college was also shut indefinitely in 2021 due to new restrictions on women's education. A new teacher certification program was due to start in 2021, but was never launched due to legal restrictions.

Jan died from heart failure in Los Angeles, on 20 July 2025, at the age of 81.

== In popular culture ==
Jan is the subject of a children's picture book biography, Razia's Ray of Hope: One Girl's Dream of an Education, written by Elizabeth Suneby and illustrated by Suana Verelst, published by Kids Can Press in 2013. The book came to the attention of Roya Hosseini and was then used as part of curriculum of the Khaled Hosseini Foundation. Razia's Ray of Hope was a Jane Addams Children’s Book Award Honor Title in 2014.
