= Folio (magazine) =

Trade magazine about magazine publishing

- Former editors: Joe Hanson (1972–1991)
- Categories: Magazine publishing
- Frequency: Monthly
- Publisher: Hanson Publications, Inc. (1972–1988); Cowles Media Company (1988-1998); Primedia (now Rent Group) (1998–2004); Red 7 Media (2004–2011); Access Intelligence (2011–2020)
- First issue: 1972
- Final issue: 2020
- Country: United States
- Website: archive.foliomag.com

Folio, also known as Folio: The Magazine of Magazine Management and Folio: magazine, was a trade magazine for the magazine industry. The magazine was established in 1972 and became known as "the bible of the magazine publishing industry".

Associated initiatives included The FOLIO: Show, a magazine industry trade show and conference; Folio: 400, a comprehensive review of major American magazines; The Folio: Ad Guide, analyzing magazine advertising; and the Folio: Source Book, a buyer's guide for publishers.

The publishers of Folio also organized the Eddie & Ozzie Awards in recognition of high-quality magazines, and inducted new members into the Editorial & Design Hall of Fame.

== Overview ==
The magazine covered various financial and publishing aspects of the magazine publishing industry. Folio: was a "vertical" publication "aimed at people who hold different jobs within" the magazine publishing industry. Many stories focused on a particular periodical.

Folio: produced two special annual editions:

- Folio: 400
- Folio: Ad Guide

== Publication history ==
Folio: was founded in 1972 by Joe Hanson of Hanson Publications, Inc. Hanson Publications was acquired by Cowles Media Company in 1988, which was then acquired by Primedia (now Rent Group) in 1998.

In 2001, under a joint venture, Folio: and a group of other trade magazines that reported on the media industry were put under the editorial control of Steven Brill. In 2003, Folio: top editor Cable Neuhaus was fired, eventually replaced with Geoff Lewis.

In 2004, Primedia sold Folio: and a sister publication, Circulation Management, to a joint venture with Red 7 Media. Red 7 was acquired by Access Intelligence in 2011.

Folio: ceased print publication in 2018 and stopped publishing digitally in 2020, with the publisher promising to continue to support its other industry activities.

== Awards ==
The Eddie & Ozzie Awards presented awards in various categories.
