= World Without Mind: The Existential Threat of Big Tech =

2017 book by Franklin Foer

World Without Mind: The Existential Threat of Big Tech is a 2017 book by Franklin Foer which argues that large American tech companies are eroding privacy and autonomous thought, and their algorithms are making humans less individualistic and more conformist.
