= August Willemsen =

August Willemsen (16 June 1936 in Amsterdam – 29 November 2007 in Amsterdam) was a Dutch translator of Portuguese and Brazilian literature. He also published essays, diaries and letters.

== Biography ==
After completing his secondary education in Amsterdam, Willemsen enrolled at the Conservatorium to study the piano. He decided, however, that literature was his first choice and, at a relatively late age, he began studying Portuguese. His translations of the Portuguese poet Fernando Pessoa gained him recognition as a leading translator. In 1983 his translations were awarded the Martinus Nijhoff Prize [nl]. In 1986 he received the Lucy B. and C.W. van der Hoogt Award [nl] for Braziliaanse brieven. Till his death on 29 November 2007, Willemsen was working on translating Pessoa's entire oeuvre.

== Limited bibliography ==
- Braziliaanse brieven, letters from Willemsen, who lived in Brazil at the time of writing, to his friends. He writes about the country, the people, the culture and the conservative Dutch expats (1985).
- De taal als bril, essays (1987).
- Een liefde in het Zuiden, en De dood in Zuid, two stories that were later included in Vrienden, vreemden, vrouwen (1988).
- De val, diary about the months during which Willemsen was recovering from a fall that was caused by an alcohol addiction. (1991).
- De Goddelijke Kanarie, lyrical history of Brazilian soccer (1994).
- Het hoogste woord, beschouwingen en boutades, essays (1994).
- Sprekend een brief, letter to Thomas Rap about the decision to start living in Australia (1998).
- Vrienden, vreemden, vrouwen, diary of the adolescent Willemsen, with critiques from the present day Willemsen (1998).
- De tuin van IJben, youth essay of a school trip to France (1999).
- Van Tibooburra naar Packsaddle (with Bert Verhoeff), essays about Australia, backpacking, Aboriginals and sports (2001).

== Translations ==
- Carlos Drummond de Andrade
- Machado de Assis
- Hector Malot, Alleen op de wereld.
- Fernando Pessoa
- Graciliano Ramos
- João Guimarães Rosa
