= The Divine Canary =

Book by August Willemsen

- Author: August Willemsen
- Original title: De Goddelijke Kanarie
- Language: Dutch
- Publication date: 1994

The Divine Canary (Dutch: De Goddelijke Kanarie) is a Dutch language book written by August Willemsen, which describes the history of football in Brazil. It was published in 1994, just before the 1994 FIFA World Cup, a tournament won by Brazil.

== Summary ==
The book opens with the quotation from Brazilian novelist Roberto Drummond ”Our Father, who art in Heaven, let all Women of this world abandon this Sinner, but do not allow, my Lord, that Cruzeiro scores the equalizing goal.”. August Willemsen, a professional translator of Portuguese, writes about the history of soccer in Brazil, not only in terms of games and statistics, but as the quotation shows, also about how it is experienced by Brazilian fans: simultaneously a feeling of joy, and of torture, and about the sometimes supernatural role of soccer in Brazilian society.

== Content ==
Willemsen describes in the various chapters the clubs (started by European immigrants, initially as a trendy English game for the wealthy), the players (called "the Canaries") and the fans, who are called “the tortured” (Portuguese: “torcedor”). Meanwhile, it presents an overview of the Brazilian soccer, which has so impressed the world in the years 1958-1970, i.e. the years with Pelé, but not only him. After the book was published, Brazil won the World Cup, which began the second period of Brazilian soccer supremacy (1994–present).

The book has a picture of the graffity after Garrincha's death: Obrigado, Garrincha, por você ter vivido ("Thanks, Garrincha, for having lived").

== Thoughts regarding the title ==
During the 1950 FIFA World Cup Brazil played at home, and lost the final in its Maracanã-stadium to Uruguay. This “fateful final” was a traumatic experience for a whole generation of Brazilians. The 1950 team played in white jerseys. After this traumatic final, the color of the jerseys of the national team were changed to yellow (in exceptional cases they play in blue, as for example in the final against Sweden in 1958). Since playing in yellow the team is affectionately called “the Canaries”.

The title of the book, The Divine Canary, consists of the nickname for the players, combined with “divine”, indicating the status of soccer players in Brazilian society. Also the title shows a subtle association with The Divine Comedy of Dante: a combination of hell, fire and heaven.

== Importance of the book ==
The book was published just prior to the 1994 FIFA World Cup, which Brazil would eventually win. The championship triggered a worldwide revival of interest in Brazilian soccer. In the Netherlands soccer fans consulted the book to learn as much as possible about Brazilian soccer. Many people, born after 1970, suddenly became Brazil experts. Sport reporters could quote the offensive line-up of 1958 by heart: (Garrincha, Didi, Vavá, Pelé, Zagallo).

When a new right-wing player joined soccer club Ajax Amsterdam, a club-manager made the dubious comment: “he reminds me of Garrincha” (possibly due to his need for alcohol?). In Dutch everyday language, soccer fans have generally adopted the name “Divine Canaries” for the Brazilian soccer team.

== See also ==
- The Last Save of Moacyr Barbosa
