= The Last Save of Moacyr Barbosa =

2005 biography

L'Ultima Parata Di Moacyr Barbosa (The Last Save of Moacyr Barbosa)
- Author: Darwin Pastorin
- Language: Italian (English trans)
- Genre: Biography
- Publisher: Arnoldo Mondadori Editore
- Publication date: 2005
- Publication place: Italy
- Media type: Print (Hardback & Paperback)

The Last Save of Moacyr Barbosa (Italian: L'ultima parata di Moacyr Barbosa) is a book by Darwin Pastorin, describing the life and times of the Brazilian goalkeeper of the 1950 World Cup, Moacyr Barbosa. Barbosa failed to stop a shot by Uruguay in the Final, and was treated as a pariah in many parts of Brazil for the rest of his life.

== Thematic treatment ==
The book is divided into five themes:

- Early playing career at Vasco de Gama and emergence from the youth development as one of the bright stars for national selection
- Description of the key 1950 game that sealed Barbosa's reputation
- Fall-out from the game, including significance of the contest in popular Brazilian football culture
- Role of the media in creating sports idols, which is also related to their fall. Calls into question media objectivity
- The personal toll the incident took on Barbosa including ostracism and widespread hostility. A religious metaphor is explored- the role of the scapegoat that must atone for sin. The dark skin of Barbosa reinforces this metaphor the author suggests.

== Media treatment ==
The Last Save describes much of the disbelief felt by many Brazilians at the loss of the game. In one radio announcement for example:

"GOOOOL do Uruguay,' said Luiz Mendes, narrating for Rádio Globo, automatically and firmly. He repeated, asking in disbelief: 'Gol do Uruguay?' He answered himself: 'Gol do Uruguay!' He repeated the same three words six more times consecutively, each with completely different intonation - with various degrees of surprise, resignation and shock.."

"Football's shrine was as quiet as a tomb. Gigghia said many years later: 'Only three people have, with just one motion, silenced the Maracanã: Frank Sinatra, Pope John Paul II and me."

== Significance of the game in culture ==
The book details the soccer culture of Brazil often unforgiving of men it puts on a pedestal, and the absolute shock to the country and its people at the loss of the game.

"It continues being the most famous goal in the history of Brazilian football...because none other transcended its status as a sporting fact...converting itself into a historic moment in the life of a nation."

The goal and the gunshot that killed Kennedy both have 'the same drama...the same movement, rhythm...the same precision of an inexorable trajectory...'They even share clouds of dust - one from a gun, one from Gigghia's left foot."

The 1988 movie Barbosa anticipates some of the themes of the book, and in 2006, prior to the 2006 World Cup, Brazil's first visibly black goalkeeper since Barbosa, Dida, asked the country to forgive the old man. Dida notes that Barbosa was voted the Number One keeper of the 1950 Cup, a testimony to his outstanding skills. "He did a lot for the Brazilian team but then he was crucified after the match. That was terrible," said Dida. "The fact that he was the number 1 shows he did a lot for Brazilian football. It is important to point out the good things he did."

== Scapegoats and sacrifices ==
The religious imagery of the scapegoat is also considered. Although Barbosa was to continue playing soccer, his days on the national team were over, and his name reviled. For the rest of his life, he was often seen as the man who choked - forever, The Unforgiven. In quasi-religious terms, the ancient role of scapegoat was to be sacrificed, to restore balance to the ruptured community. Barbosa fit the bill, and his dark skin capped the comparison, a stark reminder of the sin of losing. Barbosa was one of Brazil's few visibly black goalkeepers and Brazil was not to have another for 50 years.

In Uruguayan author Eduardo Galeano's 1999 book, Soccer in Sun and Shadow, Barbosa is quoted as saying "even a criminal when he has served his time, and paid his debt, is forgiven. But I have never been forgiven."

== See also ==
- Scapegoat
- Peter Bonetti
- Keeper
- The Divine Canary
- How Soccer Explains the World
