= How Soccer Explains the World =

2004 non-fiction work by Franklin Foer

How Soccer Explains the World: An Unlikely Theory of Globalization
- Author: Franklin Foer
- Language: English
- Subject: Soccer, globalization
- Genre: Non-fiction
- Publisher: HarperCollins
- Publication date: June 29, 2004
- Publication place: United States
- Media type: Hardback & paperback
- Pages: 272 pp (hardback edition)
- ISBN: 978-0-06-621234-0 (hardback)
- OCLC: 55756745
- Dewey Decimal: 796.334 22
- LC Class: GV943.9.S64 F64 2004

How Soccer Explains the World: An Unlikely Theory of Globalization (also published as How Football Explains the World: An Unlikely Theory of Globalization) is a book written by American journalist Franklin Foer. It is an analysis of the interchange between soccer and the new global economy.

The author takes readers on a journey from stadium to stadium around the globe in an attempt to shed new insights on today's world events, both from political and economic standpoints. Soccer is here the globalized medium that seems to lend itself to explaining the effects globalization has on society as a whole.

== Themes ==
=== Failure of globalization ===
In the first couple of chapters, Franklin Foer addresses "the failure of globalization to erode ancient hatreds in the game’s great rivalries," which is associated with football hooligans. The book continues on and talks about sectarian conflicts between supporters of Celtic F.C. and Rangers F.C. (the Old Firm) in Scotland and the tendency of supporters of Tottenham Hotspur F.C. and AFC Ajax to appropriate Jewish symbols and terminology, which results in conflicting views between things such as the antisemitic chants and taunts.

=== Rise of corporate hegemons ===
In the second part of the text, the author uses soccer "to address economics: the consequences of migration, the persistence of corruption, and the rise of powerful new oligarchs like Silvio Berlusconi, the President of [both] Italy and the AC Milan club".

=== Persistence of nationalism and tribalism ===
In the final part, Foer uses soccer "to defend the virtues of old-fashioned nationalism", as "a way to blunt the return of tribalism".

== Reception ==
The book received positive reviews in The New York Times and The Washington Post. Critics for The San Francisco Chronicle and The Boston Globe praised Foer's portrait of the soccer world while dismissing his larger arguments.

== See also ==
- The Last Save of Moacyr Barbosa
- Among the Thugs
- Globalization
