= Franklin Foer =

American journalist (born 1974)

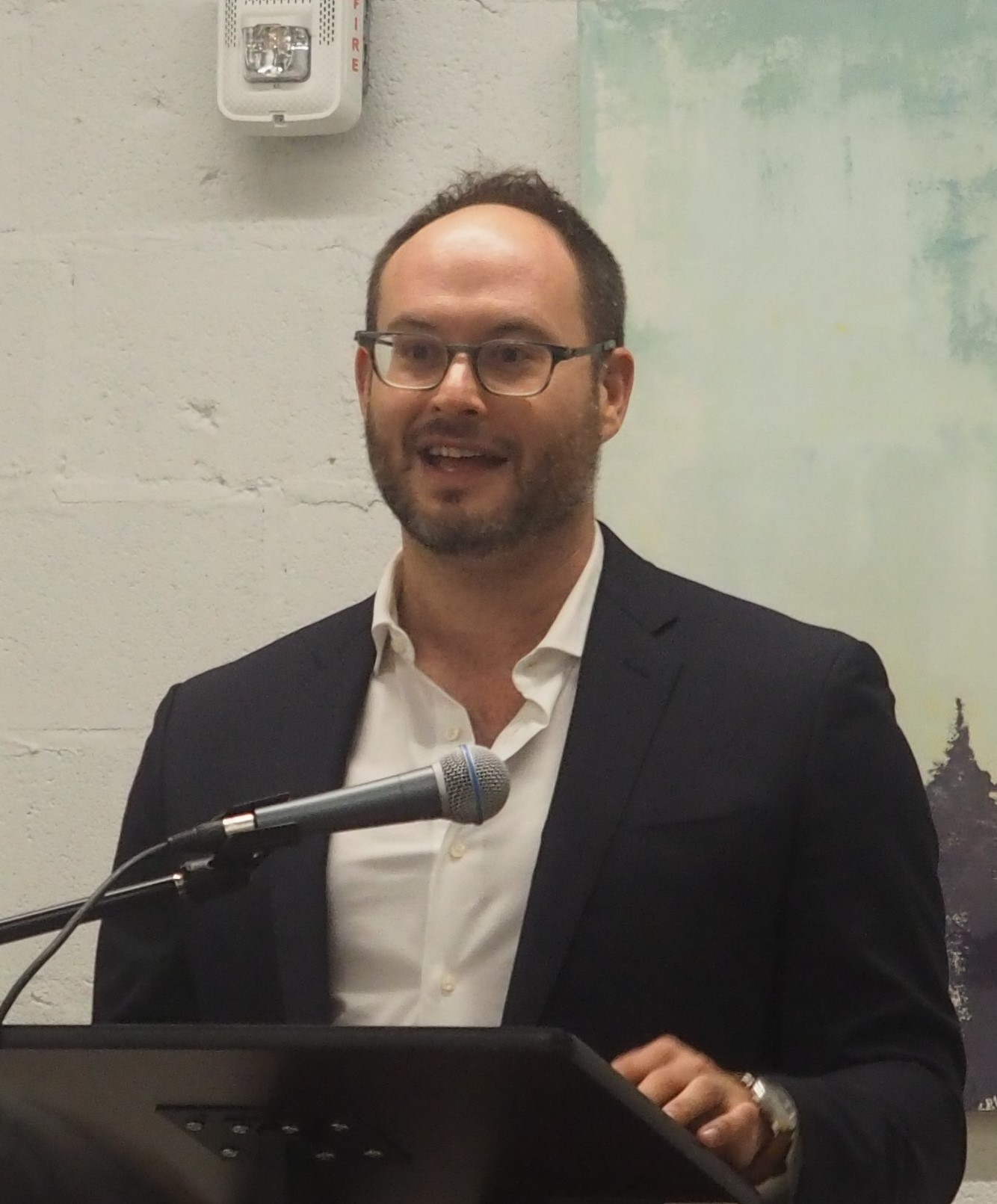
- Foer c. 2014
- Born: July 20, 1974 (age 52); Washington, D.C., U.S.
- Education: Columbia University (BA)
- Occupations: Journalist, author
- Spouse: Abby Greensfelder
- Children: 2
- Parent(s): Albert Foer; Esther Safran Foer
- Relatives: Jonathan Safran Foer (brother); Joshua Foer (brother)
- Writing career
- Genre: non-fiction
- Notable work: How Soccer Explains the World

Franklin Foer (/ˈfɔːr/; born July 20, 1974) is a staff writer at The Atlantic and former editor of The New Republic.

== Personal life ==
Foer was born in 1974 in Washington, D.C. to a Jewish family. He is the son of Albert Foer, a lawyer, and Esther Safran Foer, the child of Holocaust survivors from Poland. He is the elder brother of novelist Jonathan Safran Foer and freelance journalist Joshua Foer.

He graduated from Columbia University in 1996 and lives in Washington, D.C., with his wife and two daughters.

== Career ==
Foer has written for Slate and New York magazine. He served as editor of American magazine The New Republic from 2006 until 2010, when he resigned—by his subsequent account, because of exhaustion over an interminable search for a patron who could save the magazine. He returned as editor in 2012.

His book How Soccer Explains the World was published in 2004. The book Jewish Jocks: An Unorthodox Hall of Fame, co-edited with fellow New Republic writer Marc Tracy, was published in 2012. It won a National Jewish Book Award in 2012. Foer has described it as an effort to avoid the "simple hagiography" he found in some of the many existing books about Jewish sports figures.

Foer was editor of The New Republic during the Scott Thomas Beauchamp controversy. His firing in December 2014 by New Republic owner Chris Hughes and his replacement by former Gawker editor Gabriel Snyder provoked an editorial crisis that culminated in the resignation from the magazine of two-thirds of the people on its masthead.

In 2017, Foer published World Without Mind: The Existential Threat of Big Tech, which was named on The New York Times' 100 Notable Books of 2017. Using Facebook, Amazon, Google, and Apple as case studies, World Without Mind argues for a closer examination for the role of technology in our lives, particularly the ways it is shaping the values of individuals globally.

In October 2022, Foer reported in The Atlantic an in-depth overview of possible legal consequences of activities performed by the former president Donald Trump.

== Bibliography ==
- How Soccer Explains the World (2004)
- Jewish Jocks: An Unorthodox Hall of Fame, co-edited with Marc Tracy (2012)
- Insurrections of the Mind: 100 Years of Politics and Culture in America (2014)
- World Without Mind: The Existential Threat of Big Tech (2017)
- The Last Politician: Inside Joe Biden's White House and the Struggle for America's Future (2023)
