= ATWA =

Philosophy of the Manson Family cult

ATWA (an acronym for Air, Trees, Water, Animals and All The Way Alive) is the ecological belief system propounded by Charles Manson, who was later convicted of conspiracy to commit murder as the leader of the communal Manson Family. ATWA names the interrelated life-support systems of the Earth. Manson and his associates, most notably Lynette Fromme and Sandra Good, use the term to name the forces of life which they believe hold the balance of the Earth.

== Origins ==
Manson was paroled in 1967 and found a welcoming environment in the burgeoning counterculture. Together with a small retinue of disaffected young people, he took flight from what he characterized as the "madness of the cities" and established a communal colony at the Spahn Ranch in the Santa Susana Mountains outside of Los Angeles, California. The group began to make survivalist forays into Death Valley in order to scout out more remote areas of the desert.

In September 1969, some members attempted to thwart nearby road developments by deliberately setting an expensive piece of earth moving equipment on fire. This early act of eco-terrorism occurred a number of years before the concept was popularized by Edward Abbey, Dave Foreman, and other radical environmentalists.

== Lynette Fromme and Sandra Good ==
In the years following Manson's conviction and imprisonment for conspiracy to commit the murders of seven people, Lynette Fromme and Sandra Good became increasingly active in their efforts to raise awareness of the present system's failure to properly steward the Earth.

In 1975, Lynette Fromme was found guilty of the attempted assassination of then-president Gerald Ford. While questioned in custody she was asked why she had pointed the gun; she stated, "I stood up and waved a gun (at Ford) for a reason, I was so relieved not to have to shoot it, but, in truth, I came to get life. Not just my life but clean air, healthy water and respect for creatures and creation." In August 2009, Fromme was released from federal prison after serving 34 years.

Sandra Good was imprisoned for 10 years for conspiracy to send threatening letters to corporate executives unless their corporations ceased polluting the environment. After her release in 1985, Good led a campaign against International Paper Co., which she said was harming Lake Champlain.

== In popular culture ==
Metal band System of a Down has a song named "ATWA" on their 2001 album Toxicity.

In the movie Manson Family Vacation (2015), the character Conrad wants to be a member of an environmental organization based on the ATWA philosophy.
