= Squeaky Fromme =

American cultist convicted of presidential assassination attempt (born 1948)

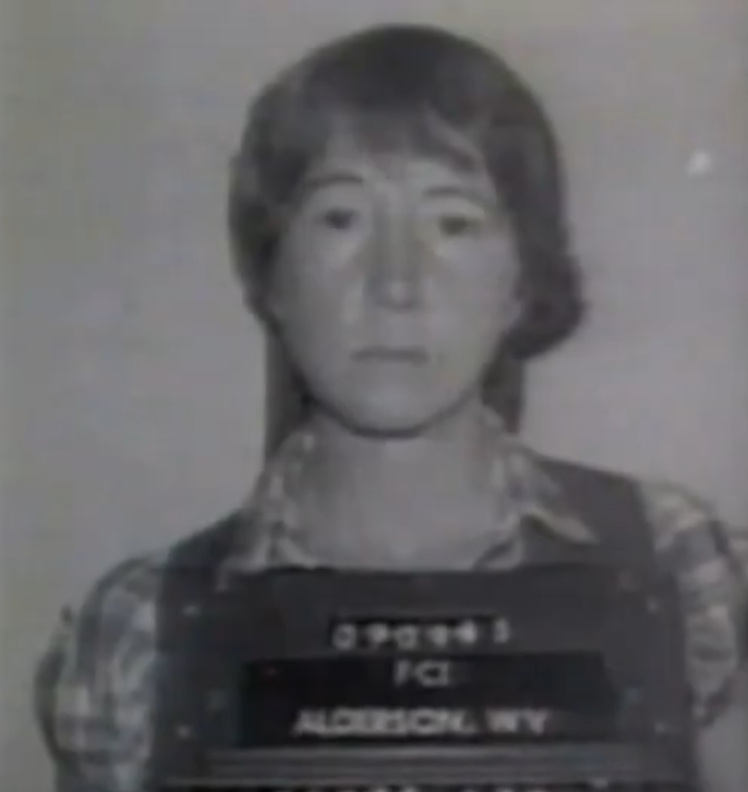
- Fromme's mugshot following her arrest in 1975
- Born: Lynette Alice Fromme; October 22, 1948 (age 78); Santa Monica, California, U.S.
- Other names: Red, Squeaky
- Known for: Attempted assassination of Gerald Ford in Sacramento
- Status: Paroled
- Allegiance: Manson Family
- Motive: To set an example to those refusing to halt environmental pollution and its effects on ATWA
- Convictions: Attempting to kill the President
- Penalty: Life imprisonment

Details
- Date: September 5, 1975
- Locations: Capitol Park; Sacramento, California
- Target: Gerald Ford
- Killed: 0
- Weapon: Colt M1911 .45 cal. semi-automatic pistol

Lynette Alice "Squeaky" Fromme (/ˈfroʊmi/ FROH-mee; born October 22, 1948) is an American former member of the Manson Family, a cult led by Charles Manson. Though not involved in the Tate–LaBianca murders for which the Manson family is best known, she attempted to assassinate U.S. president Gerald Ford in 1975. For that crime, she was sentenced to life in prison. She was paroled from prison on August 14, 2009, after serving approximately 34 years. She published a book about her life in 2018.

== Early life ==
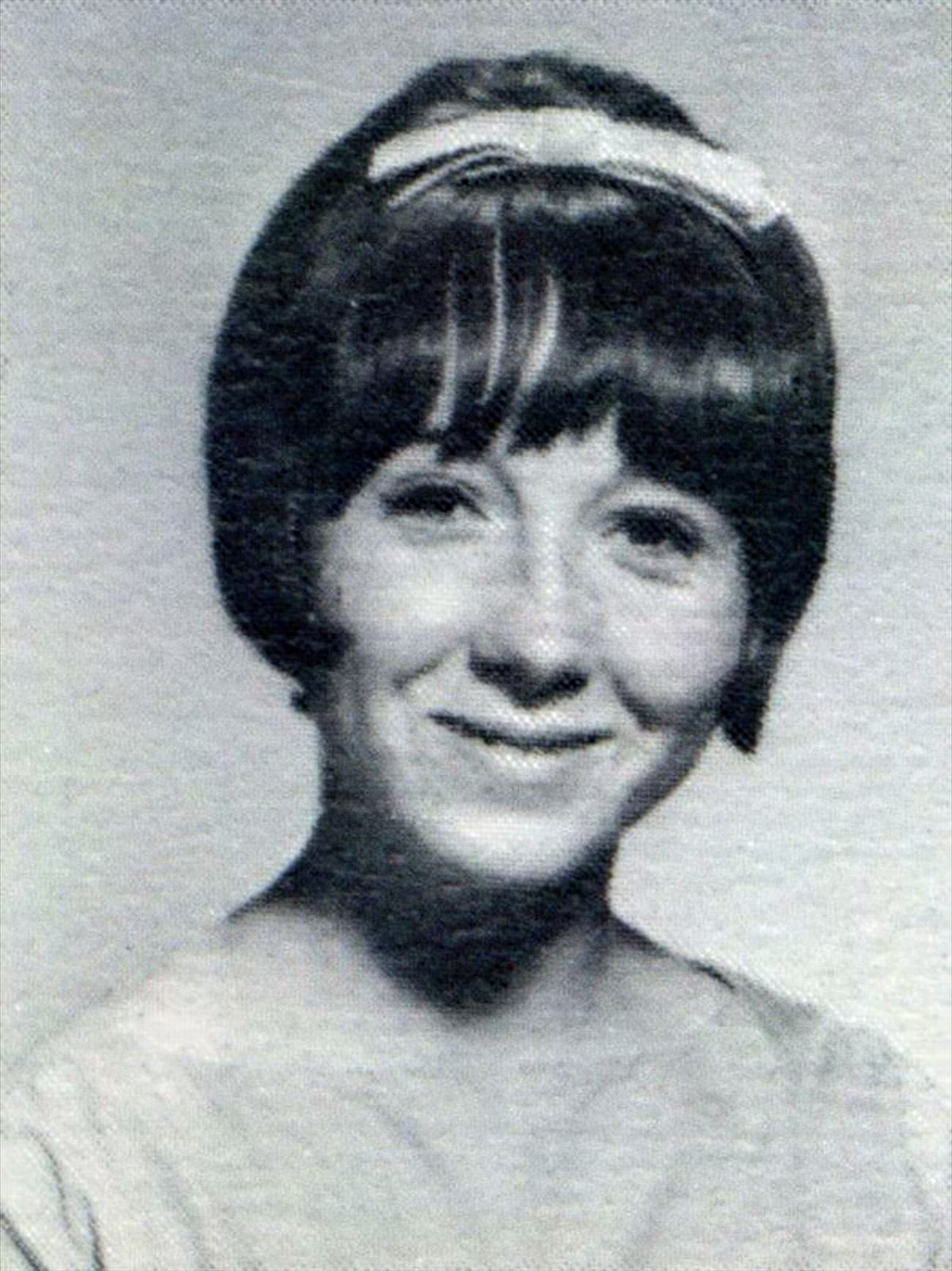
Fromme's 1964 high school junior year yearbook photo

Lynette Alice Fromme was born on October 22, 1948, in Santa Monica, California. She was the daughter of Helen (née Benzinger) and William Millar Fromme (an aeronautical engineer). As a child, Fromme performed with a dance group called the Westchester Lariats, which began touring the United States and Europe in the late 1950s. She and the Lariats made an appearance on The Lawrence Welk Show and at the White House.

She attended Orville Wright Junior High School from 1960 to 1963, before the family moved to Redondo Beach, California. She attended Redondo Union High School, and while in high school, Fromme began using alcohol and drugs. Her grades dropped, but she graduated high school in 1966. She moved out of her parents' house for a few months before her father convinced her to enroll at El Camino College. She returned home for two months before her father kicked her out following an argument, leaving her homeless.

== Charles Manson and her involvement with the Manson Family ==
By 1967, at the age of 19, Fromme had dropped out of college. She went to Venice Beach after her parents threw her out of her family's house. Suffering from depression, she sat on a curb and watched a bus arrive, and Charles Manson exited. Manson stopped and looked at her and said, "Your parents threw you out, didn't they?" Fromme immediately decided Manson was a psychic. Manson walked away as Fromme picked up her belongings and followed him. Manson had recently been released from the federal prison at Terminal Island, and Fromme became the second member of what became the Manson Family.

Fromme found Manson's philosophies and attitudes appealing, and the two became friends and traveled together with other young people, including Mary Brunner and Susan Atkins. She lived with the Manson Family at Spahn Ranch where they worked for their keep, and at the Barker Ranch in Death Valley, which was owned by the grandmother of one of the Family members. According to Manson Family member Paul Watkins, ranch owner George Spahn gave her the nickname "Squeaky" because of the sound that she made when Spahn ran his hand up her thigh.

Manson and some of his followers were arrested for the Sharon Tate and Leno and Rosemary LaBianca murders in 1969, and during the murder trial, Fromme and the remaining members of the Manson Family camped outside the courthouse. Manson and his fellow defendants Atkins, Patricia Krenwinkel, and Leslie Van Houten carved Xs into their foreheads, and so did Fromme and her compatriots. They proclaimed Manson's innocence and they also preached his apocalyptic philosophy to the news media and anyone else who was willing to listen to them. Fromme was not charged with involvement in the murders but she was convicted of attempting to prevent Manson's imprisoned followers from testifying, and she was also convicted of contempt of court when she refused to testify. She was sentenced to serve short jail terms for both offenses.

Fromme and Sandra Good moved into an older attic apartment in downtown Sacramento, because they wanted to be near Manson after he was moved to Folsom State Prison. She and Good lived in the third-floor apartment at 1725 P Street in Sacramento (38.571136°N 121.485786°W).

Around 1973, Fromme started to write an extensive 600-page book about the Manson Family. It included intricate drawings and photos; other family members had also contributed to it. Fromme sent it to publishers, but she dropped her plan to get it published after she discussed it with Clem Grogan, deciding that the project was too incriminating. The book, titled Reflexion, was eventually published in 2018 by the Peasenhall Press.

== Murder in Stockton, California ==
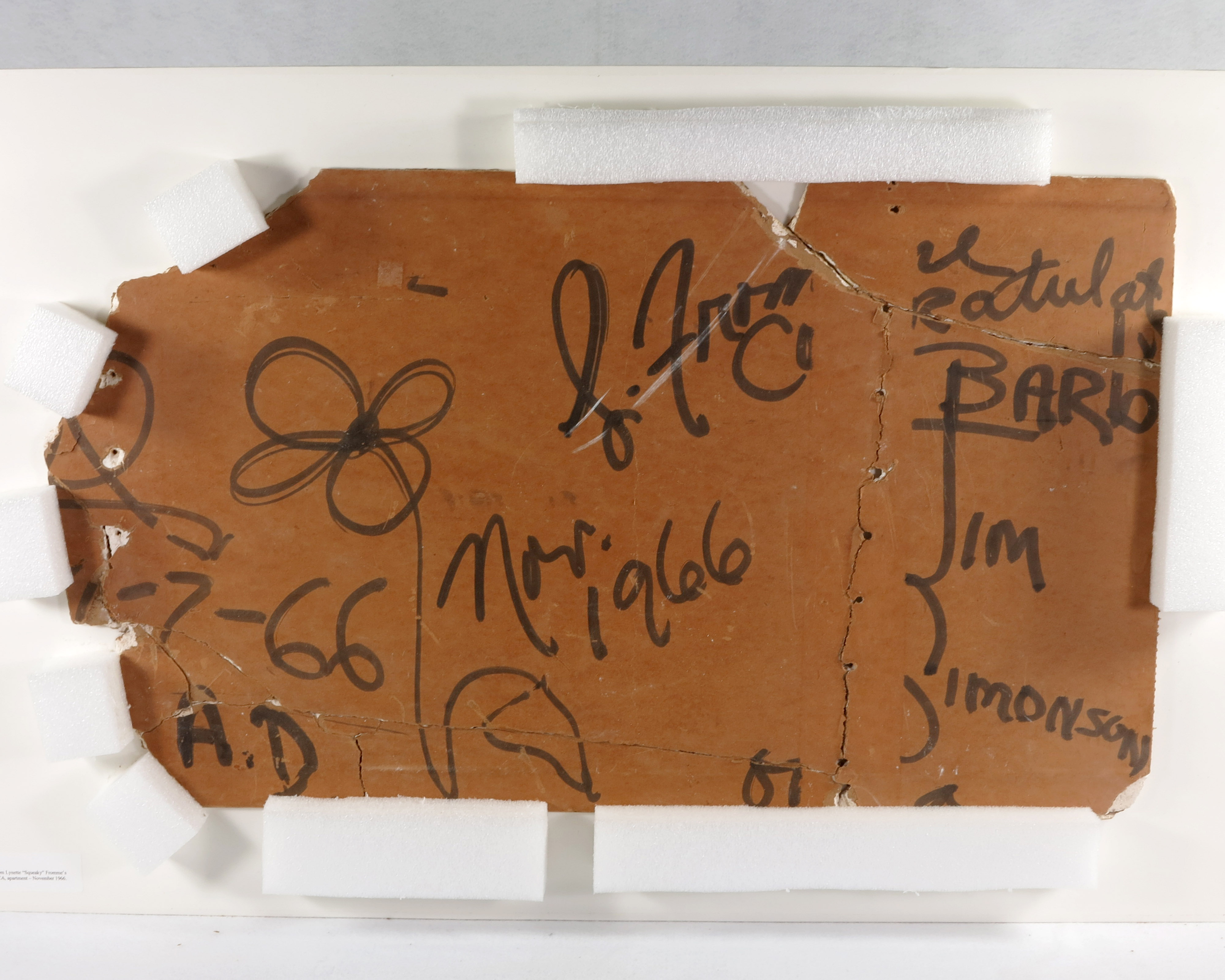
A section from a wall of Fromme's Redondo Beach apartment

Fromme traveled to Stockton in 1972 with Nancy Pitman, Priscilla Cooper, and Aryan Brotherhood members Michael Monfort and James Craig, in order to follow through with Manson's deal with the Brotherhood. This group met James and Lauren Willett at a cabin. In November 1972, Monfort and Craig forced James Willett to dig his own grave and then shot him because he was going to tell the authorities about a series of robberies that they had committed after they were released from prison. His body was found with his hand still sticking out of the ground. The housemates were arrested on suspicion of murder, after which Lauren Willett's body was discovered in the basement. She had been shot to death. The Willetts' eight-month-old daughter, Heidi, was found alive in the house. Fromme was released for lack of evidence.

The Sonoma County coroner's office concluded that James Willett was killed sometime in September 1972, although his decapitated body was not found until November. He had been buried near Guerneville. On the night of November 11, 1972, the Stockton Police responded to information that a station wagon owned by the Willetts was parked in front of 720 W. Flora St. Sergeant Richard Whiteman forced his way into the house: "All the persons subsequently arrested were in the house except for Fromme. She telephoned the house while police were there, asking to be picked up, and officers obliged, taking her into custody nearby. Police found a quantity of guns and ammunition in the house along with amounts of marijuana and noticed freshly dug earth beneath the building."

Fromme later told reporters that she had been traveling in California trying to visit "brothers" in jail and to visit Manson. She said that she came to Stockton on November 10 to visit William Goucher, who was in jail on a robbery charge, when Lauren died. When Fromme left the jail after visiting Goucher, she called the house on Flora Street to have someone pick her up, and the Stockton Police traced the call and arrested her at a phone booth.

The Stockton Police exhumed the body of Lauren Willett the following day. Cooper told investigators that she had been shot accidentally, contending that Monfort was "demonstrating the dangers of firearms, playing a form of Russian roulette with a .38 caliber pistol" and had first spun the gun cylinder and shot at his own head, and then pointed it at the victim, when it fired. The police determined that Lauren had been with them voluntarily. Fromme was never charged with being involved in the murders but she was convicted of attempting to prevent Manson's imprisoned followers from testifying, as well as being convicted of contempt of court when she refused to testify. The other four people who were involved were convicted.

After leaving Stockton, Fromme moved into a Sacramento apartment with Sandra Good. The two wore robes on occasion and they changed their names to symbolize their devotion to Manson's new religion, Fromme becoming "Red" in honor of her red hair and the California redwoods, and Good becoming "Blue" for her blue eyes and the ocean; both nicknames were originally given to them by Manson.

== Attempt to contact Jimmy Page ==
Prior to a Led Zeppelin concert in Long Beach in 1975, Fromme knocked on the hotel door of Danny Goldberg, vice president of the band's record label, Swan Song Records. Fromme, described as frantic and with a nervous tic marring her face, asked to meet with Led Zeppelin guitarist Jimmy Page to warn him, claiming to have foreseen the future and wishing to warn Page of imminent "evil" which she believed might take place that night at the concert. Goldberg stated that she could not see Page until the following night, to which Fromme responded "tomorrow night will probably be too late". After a long discussion, Goldberg agreed to deliver a message to Page if she wrote it down. Fromme was subsequently escorted away against her will and the note was ultimately burned and never read. Goldberg later saw Fromme on the television news after she had attempted to assassinate Gerald Ford.

== Assassination attempt on President Ford ==
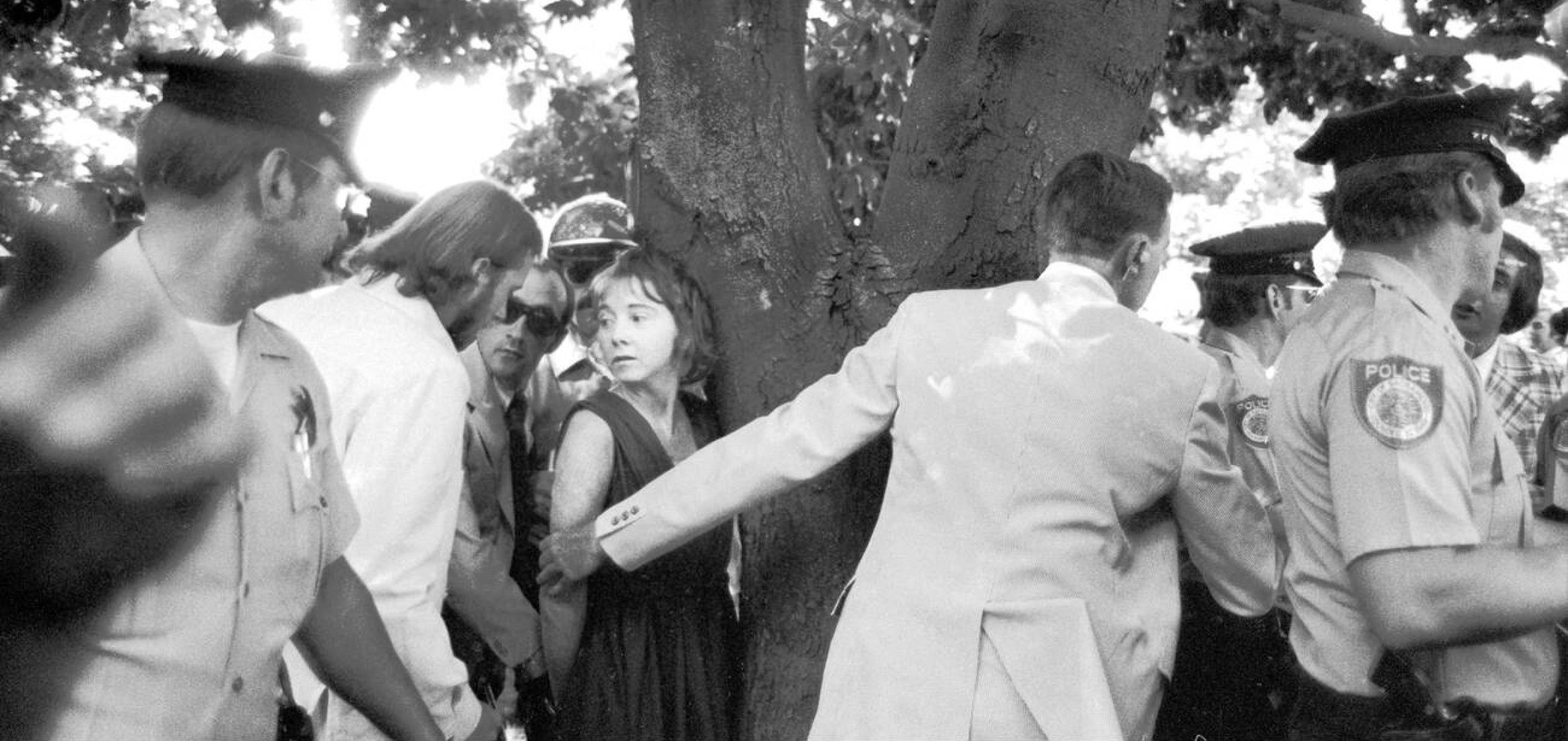
Fromme being detained following the incident

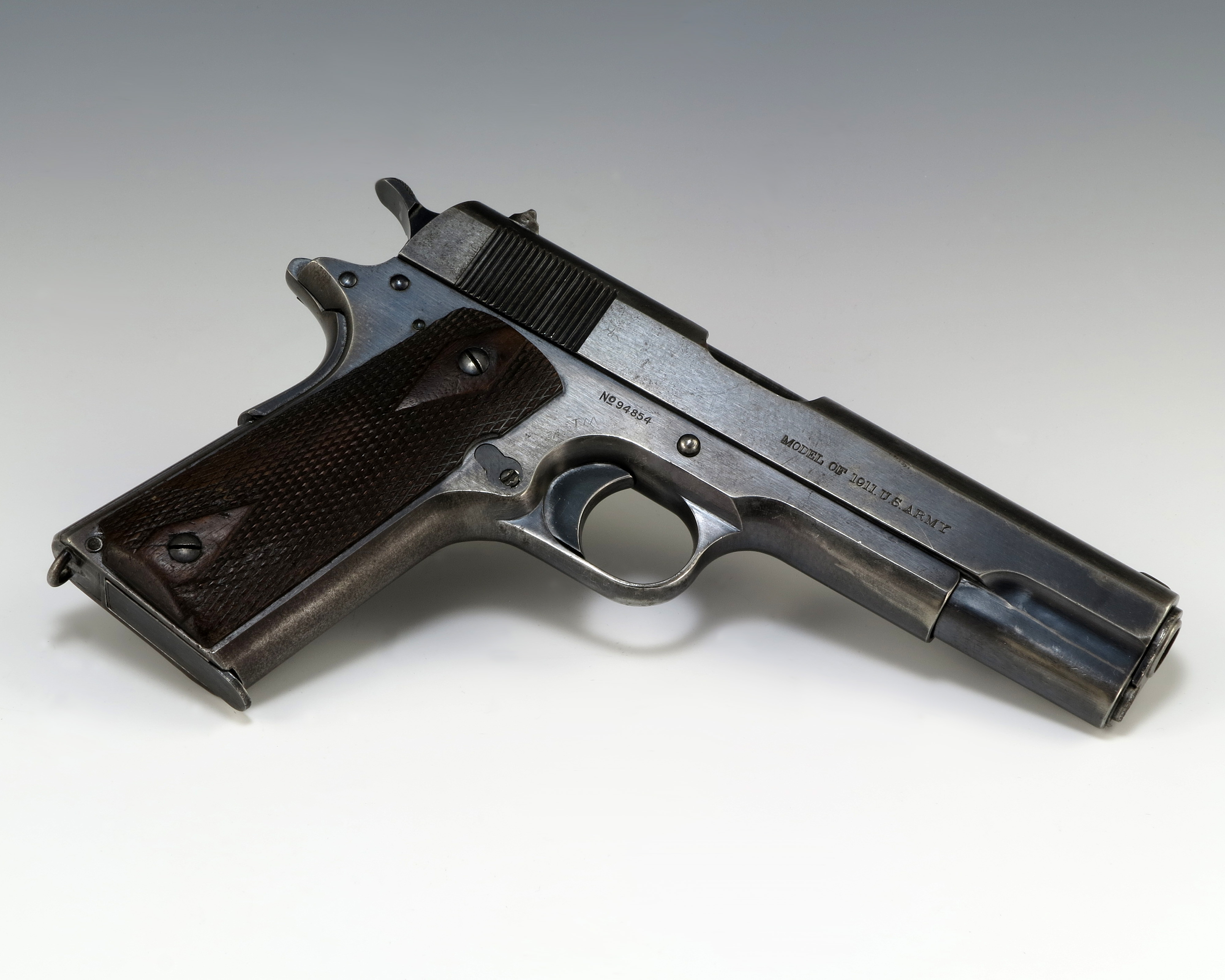
The Colt M1911 .45-caliber pistol used in Fromme's attempt to assassinate President Gerald Ford

On the morning of September 5, 1975, Fromme went to Sacramento's Capitol Park, ostensibly to plead with Gerald Ford about the plight of the California redwoods, dressed in a red robe and armed with a Colt M1911 .45-caliber semi-automatic pistol. The pistol's magazine was loaded with four rounds, but there was no round in the chamber. When Fromme pointed the gun at Ford she was immediately restrained by Secret Service agent Larry Buendorf. As she was apprehended, she reportedly yelled "it wouldn't go off" and said "it didn't go off. Can you believe it? It didn't go off" when brought to the ground by Buendorf. In 1980, Fromme told The Sacramento Bee that she had deliberately ejected the round from her weapon's chamber before leaving home that morning, and investigators later found a round on her bathroom floor.

Fromme refused to cooperate with her own defense during her trial. Despite claiming that "I was not determined to kill the guy", Fromme was convicted of the attempted assassination of the president and received a life sentence under a 1965 law that made attempted presidential assassinations a federal crime. After United States Attorney Dwayne Keyes recommended severe punishment, because she was "full of hate and violence", Fromme threw an apple at him, hitting him in the face and knocking off his glasses. She told the press that she "came to get life. Not just my life but clean air, healthy water, and respect for creatures and creation."

=== Aftermath ===
In 1979, Fromme was transferred out of Federal Correctional Institution, Dublin, California, for attacking fellow inmate Julienne Bušić with a hammer. On December 23, 1987, she escaped from Federal Prison Camp, Alderson in West Virginia in an attempt to meet Manson. She was captured two days later and incarcerated at the Federal Medical Center, Carswell, in Fort Worth, Texas.

Fromme continued to profess total allegiance to Manson. Vincent Bugliosi wrote in Helter Skelter that she and Good were the only members of the Manson Family who had not renounced him. She once told an Associated Press reporter, "The curtain is going to come down on all of us, and if we don't turn everything over to Charlie immediately, it will be too late."

Fromme first became eligible for parole in 2005. She waived her right to request a hearing and was required by federal law to complete a parole application before one could be considered and granted. She was granted parole in July 2008, but she was not released because of the extra time which was added to her sentence because of her escape from prison in 1987.

She was released on parole from the Federal Medical Center, Carswell, on August 14, 2009, and she moved to Marcy, New York, where she and her boyfriend Robert Valdner live. In a 2019 televised interview, Fromme said the following about Manson, "Was I in love with Charlie? Yeah, [...] I still am."

== In popular culture ==
- In 1975, Fromme was portrayed by Laraine Newman on the third episode of Saturday Night Live, in a sketch titled "Dangerous but Inept", in which she is interviewed on a talk show with that title by its host, Jane Curtin.
- Fromme is a character in Stephen Sondheim and John Weidman's Assassins (1990), a musical about nine people who attempted to assassinate a U.S. president.
- Fromme is played by Kayli Carter in the 2018 Mary Harron-directed biographical drama film Charlie Says.
- Fromme is portrayed by Dakota Fanning in Quentin Tarantino's film Once Upon a Time in Hollywood (2019).

== Books ==
- Bravin, Jess (1997). Squeaky: The Life and Times of Lynette Alice Fromme. St Martin's Press. ISBN 0312156634. OCLC 1014033645.
- Fromme, Lynette Alice (2018). Reflexion: Lynette Fromme's Story of Her Life with Charles Manson 1967–1969. Cobb, CA: The Peasenhall Press. ISBN 0991372514. OCLC 1151710773.

== See also ==
- Sara Jane Moore, also tried to assassinate President Gerald Ford
