= Sandra Good =

Member of the Manson Family (born 1944)

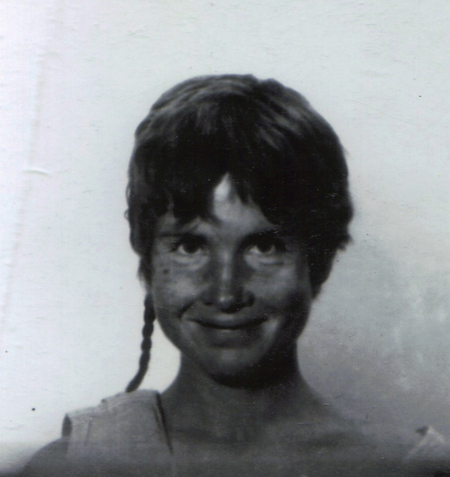
- Mug shot taken in 1969
- Born: Sandra Collins Good; February 20, 1944 (age 82); San Diego, California, U.S.
- Children: 1
- Status: Paroled in 1985
- Criminal charges: Conspiracy to send threatening letters
- Penalty: 15 years in prison (served about 10)

Sandra Collins Good (born February 20, 1944) is an American criminal and member of the Manson Family. Good's Manson Family nickname is "Blue", which was given to her by Charles Manson to represent clean air and water.

== Early life ==
Good was born in San Diego, California, the daughter of a stockbroker. Her parents divorced when she was four years old. Good attended Point Loma High School and was a member of the Student Opinion Club. Good attended California State University Sacramento, the University of Oregon and San Francisco State College off and on for seven years, but never received a degree.

== Manson Family ==
Good joined the Manson Family in April 1968 and a few months later went off with them when they moved to a new home at Spahn Ranch in the mountains west of Chatsworth. She was in jail with Mary Brunner for attempting to use stolen credit cards when the Tate/La Bianca murders took place, but was back at the ranch in time to get arrested during the August 16 raid. (Good wrote extensively about meeting Charles Manson, her life in “the Family,” and the Tate/LaBianca murders in Lynette Fromme's 2018 memoir Reflexion.)

She has a son named Ivan S. Pugh (born September 16, 1969). Various men have been named as the father, most notably Joel Pugh (1940–1969), who was found dead in a London hotel room under suspicious circumstances. Although Ivan took Joel's surname, his biological father is Manson Family associate Bobby Beausoleil, who murdered Gary Hinman in 1969.

In a telephone interview with WWL (AM) in New Orleans soon after Lynette Fromme's attempted assassination of Gerald Ford, Good threatened that "a wave of assassins" from a group that she identified as the International Peoples Court of Retribution (see ATWA) would kill or disfigure certain business executives, whom she named, as well as members of their families. Good accused the executives of polluting the environment. On September 10, 1975, in a subsequent interview with Barbara Frum of the CBC radio program As It Happens, Good made similar threats against persons to avenge the killing of trees. She also did a telephone interview with Hamilton, Ontario broadcaster Bob Bratina on CHML Radio.

== Prison ==
On December 22, 1975, Good and another Manson devotee, Susan Murphy, were indicted for "conspiracy to send threatening letters through the mail" by a federal grand jury in Sacramento in connection with death threats against more than 170 corporate executives who Good believed were polluting the Earth (see ATWA). Found guilty on March 16, 1976, Good was sentenced on April 13 to a 15-year prison term.

== Parole ==
Good was paroled in early December 1985, and released from the Federal Correctional Center for Women in Alderson, West Virginia, after having served nearly 10 years of her 15-year sentence. Unlike several other Family members, Good was still loyal to Manson. A condition of her parole was that she could not reside in California. She lived instead in Vermont, where she lived quietly under the name Sandra Collins (or at times, "Blue Collins") until 1989, when her environmental activism made the news and her identity was made public.

Following her parole, Good moved to Hanford, California, near Corcoran State Prison, to be closer to Manson, although as a convicted felon she was not permitted to visit him. On January 26, 1996, she and George Stimson began a now-defunct, pro-Manson website named Access Manson, about which prosecutor Stephen Kay said, "[it] gives her [Good] an outlet where she can do things for [Manson]." Good also used the website to support Manson's environmental movement, ATWA (Air Trees Water Animals).

In a 2019 interview, Good still professed total allegiance to Manson, saying, "They [Manson and his "family"] really saved my health, my brain, my emotional health, my mental health, my physical health. I'm thankful to them all," and credited Manson with teaching her about the "deep connection to the natural world." Good also said, "You want to talk about devils and demonic and immoral and evil, go to Hollywood [...] How can you point the finger at us and call us evil for being good soldiers and doing what needed to be done?”

== In popular culture ==
- Rob Zombie cites Good as one of the inspirations for Sheri Moon Zombie's character Baby Firefly for his 2003 film House of 1000 Corpses.
- Good is portrayed by Kansas Bowling in Quentin Tarantino's 2019 film Once Upon a Time in Hollywood.
