= Manson Family =

Commune, gang, and cult in California led by Charles Manson

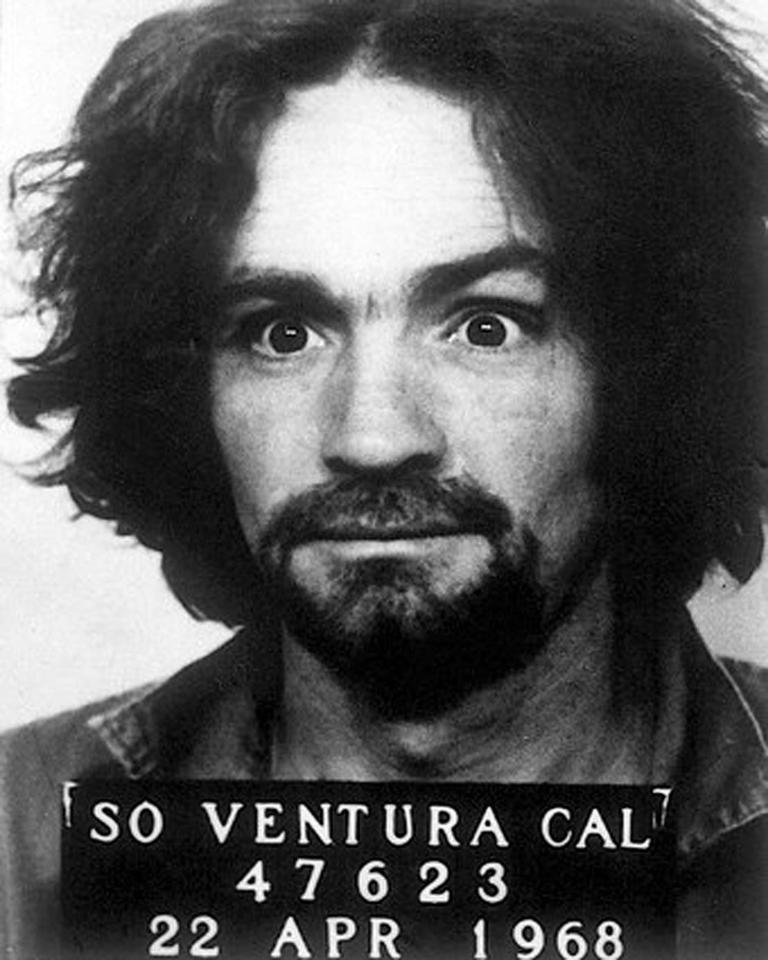
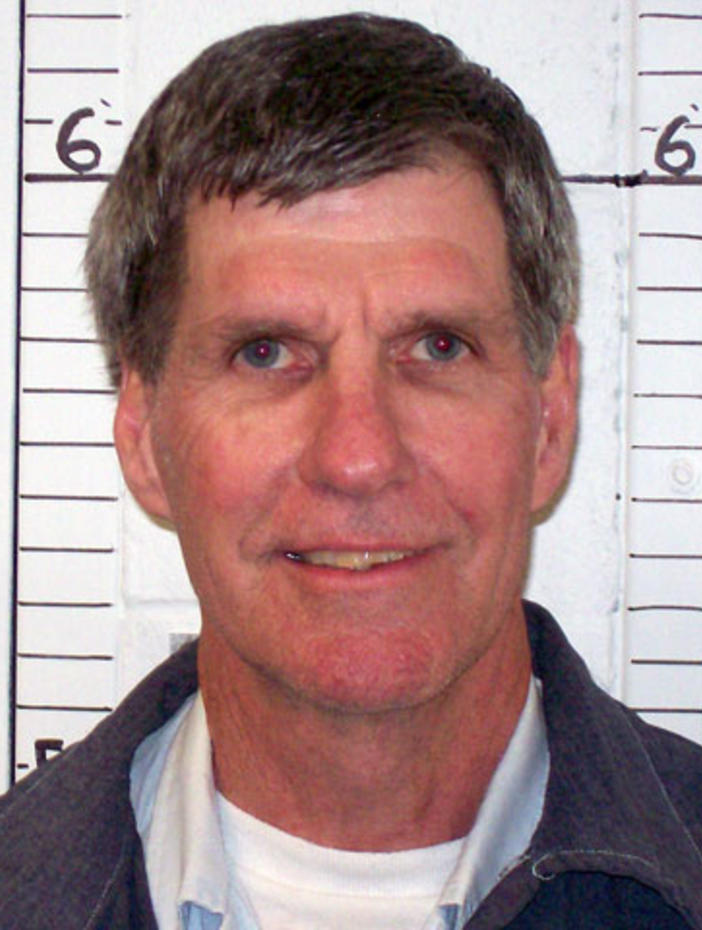
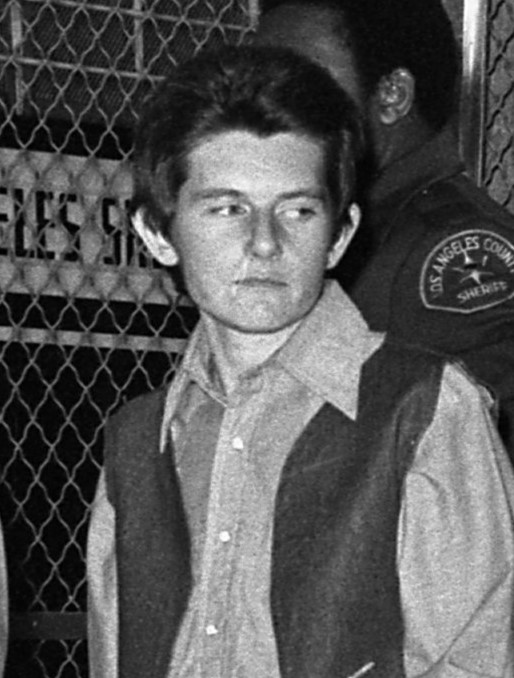
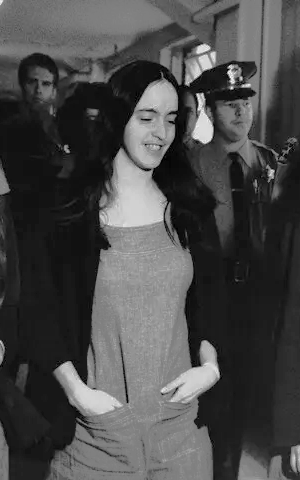
- From left to right; Charles Manson, Tex Watson, Patricia Krenwinkel, and Susan Atkins, all of whom were members of the Manson Family involved in the Tate-LaBianca murders
- Other name: The Family
- Founder: Charles Manson
- Leader: Charles Manson
- Founded: 1967; 59 years ago
- Dates active: 1967–1969
- Dissolved: 1970; 56 years ago
- Country: United States
- Headquarters: Spahn Ranch, Los Angeles (1967–1968); Barker Ranch, Death Valley National Park (1968–1969)
- Status: Dissolved upon arrest of Manson and other members
- Size: 100 members
- Criminal information

Details
- Killed: 9–24
- Injured: 1

The Manson Family (known among its members as the Family) was a commune, gang and cult led by criminal Charles Manson that was active in California in the late 1960s and early 1970s. The description of the group as a "Family" was figurative, rather than literal; the group was not known to contain any members of Charles Manson’s actual family. At its peak the group consisted of approximately 100 followers who lived an unconventional lifestyle, frequently using psychoactive drugs, including amphetamine and hallucinogens such as LSD. Most were young women from middle-class backgrounds, many of whom had been attracted to the hippie counterculture and communal living, and then radicalized by Manson's teachings. The group murdered at least nine people, and may have killed as many as twenty-four.

Manson had been institutionalized or incarcerated for more than half of his life by the time he was released from prison in 1967. He began attracting followers in the San Francisco Bay Area. They gradually moved to a run-down movie ranch, called the Spahn Ranch, on the outskirts of Los Angeles. According to group member Susan Atkins, members of the Family became convinced that Manson was a manifestation of Jesus Christ, and believed in his prophecies concerning an imminent apocalyptic race war.

In 1969, Manson Family members Atkins, Charles Denton "Tex" Watson, and Patricia Krenwinkel entered the home of actress Sharon Tate and murdered her and four others. Linda Kasabian was also present but did not take part. The following night, members of the Family murdered supermarket executive Leno LaBianca and his wife Rosemary at their home in Los Angeles. Members also committed a number of assaults, petty crimes, theft and street vandalism, including an assassination attempt on U.S. president Gerald Ford in 1975 by Family member Lynette "Squeaky" Fromme.

== Confirmed members and associates ==
The following is an incomplete list of individuals associated with the Manson Family:

- Susan Atkins a.k.a. "Sadie" (died in prison, 2009)
- Ella Jo Bailey (died 2015)
- Larry Bailey
- Susan Bartell
- Bobby Beausoleil a.k.a "Cupid"
- Mary Brunner
- Sherry Cooper
- Madeline Cottage
- Bruce M. Davis (died in prison, 2026)
- Danny DeCarlo
- Lynette Fromme a.k.a. "Squeaky"
- Catherine Gillies a.k.a. "Cappy" (died 2018)
- Sandra Good a.k.a. "Blue"
- Clem Grogan
- John Haught a.k.a. "Zero" (died 1969)
- Barbara Hoyt (died 2017)
- Gregg Jakobson
- Linda Kasabian (died 2023)
- Phil Kaufman
- Patricia Krenwinkel a.k.a. "Katie"
- Dianne Lake a.k.a. "Snake"
- Kathryn Lutesinger a.k.a "Kitty"
- Charles Manson (died in prison, 2017)
- Ruth Ann Moorehouse a.k.a. "Ouisch"
- Dean Allen Moorehouse (died 2010)
- Nancy Pitman
- Brooks Poston
- Dennis Rice (died 2013)
- Stephanie Schram
- Catherine Share a.k.a. "Gypsy"
- Deirdre Shaw, daughter of Angela Lansbury
- George Spahn (died 1974)
- Leslie Van Houten
- Thomas Walleman a.k.a. "T.J." (died 1995)
- Paul Watkins (died 1990)
- Charles Watson a.k.a. "Tex"

== Formation ==
=== San Francisco followers ===
Following his release from prison on March 22, 1967, Charles Manson moved to San Francisco, where, with the help of a prison acquaintance, he moved into an apartment in Berkeley. In prison, bank robber Alvin Karpis had taught Manson to play the steel guitar. Living mostly by begging, Manson soon became acquainted with Mary Brunner, a 23-year-old graduate of the University of Wisconsin–Madison, who was working as a library assistant at the University of California, Berkeley, and moved in with her. According to a second-hand account, Manson overcame Brunner's resistance to his bringing other women in to live with them. Before long, the pair were sharing Brunner's residence with eighteen other women.

Manson established himself as a guru in San Francisco's Haight-Ashbury district, which during 1967's "Summer of Love" was emerging as the signature hippie locale. He may have borrowed some of his philosophy from the Process Church of the Final Judgement, members of which believed Satan would become reconciled to Jesus and they would come together at the end of the world to judge humanity. Manson soon had the first of his groups of followers, most of them female; they were later dubbed the "Manson Family" by Los Angeles prosecutor Vincent Bugliosi and the media. Manson allegedly taught his followers that they were the reincarnation of the original Christians, and that the establishment could be characterized as the Romans. Sometime around 1967, he began using the alias "Charles Willis Manson."

Before the end of summer, Manson and some of his followers began traveling in an old school bus they had adapted, putting colored rugs and pillows in place of the many seats they had removed. They eventually settled in the Los Angeles areas of Topanga Canyon, Malibu and Venice.

In 1967, Brunner became pregnant by Manson. On April 15, 1968, she gave birth to their son, whom she named Valentine Michael (after the protagonist of the Robert Heinlein science fiction novel Stranger in a Strange Land), in a condemned house where they were living in Topanga Canyon. She was assisted by several of the young women from the Family. Like most members of the group, Brunner acquired a number of aliases and nicknames, including: "Marioche", "Och", "Mother Mary", "Mary Manson", "Linda Dee Manson" and "Christine Marie Euchts."

=== Manson's self-presentation ===
Actor Al Lewis had Manson babysit his children on a couple of occasions and described him as "a nice guy when I knew him." Music producer Phil Kaufman introduced Manson to Universal Studios producer Gary Stromberg, then working on a film adaptation of the life of Jesus set in modern America, featuring a Black Jesus and southern "redneck Romans." Stromberg thought that Manson made interesting suggestions about what Jesus might do in a situation, seeming to be attuned to the role. He had one of his women kiss his feet and then kissed hers in return to demonstrate the place of women. At the beach one day, Stromberg watched while Manson preached against a materialistic outlook. One of his listeners questioned him about the well-furnished bus. Manson tossed the bus keys to the doubter, who promptly drove the bus away while Manson watched, apparently unconcerned.

According to Stromberg, Manson had a dynamic personality; he was able to read a person's emotional weaknesses and manipulate them. For example, Manson tried to manipulate Danny DeCarlo, the treasurer of the Straight Satans motorcycle club, by granting him "access" to Family women. He convinced DeCarlo that his large penis helped keep the women in the group.

=== Involvement with Wilson, Melcher and others ===
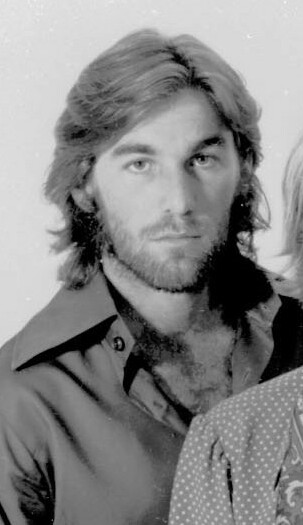
Dennis Wilson with the Beach Boys in 1968

In late spring 1968, Dennis Wilson of the Beach Boys picked up Patricia Krenwinkel and Ella Jo Bailey when they were hitchhiking, while under the influence of alcohol and LSD. Wilson took them to his Pacific Palisades house for a few hours. The following morning, when he returned home from a night recording session, he was greeted by Manson in the driveway, who emerged from his house. Wilson asked the stranger whether he intended to hurt him. Manson assured him that he had no such intent and began kissing Wilson's feet. Inside the house, Wilson discovered twelve strangers, mostly women.

The account given in Manson in His Own Words is that Manson first met Wilson at a friend's San Francisco house where Manson had gone to obtain marijuana. Manson claimed that Wilson gave him his Sunset Boulevard address and invited him to stop by when he came to Los Angeles. Wilson said in a 1968 Record Mirror article that when he mentioned the Beach Boys' involvement with Maharishi Mahesh Yogi to a group of strange women, "they told me they too had a guru, a guy named Charlie."

Over the next few months, the number of women doubled in Wilson's house. He covered their costs, which amounted to approximately $100,000. This total included a large medical bill for treatment of their gonorrhea, and $21,000 for the destruction of his uninsured car, which they borrowed. Wilson would sing and talk with Manson, and both men treated the women as servants.

Wilson paid for studio time to record songs written and performed by Manson and introduced him to entertainment business acquaintances, including Gregg Jakobson, Terry Melcher and Rudi Altobelli. Altobelli owned a house which he rented to actress Sharon Tate and her husband, director Roman Polanski. Jakobson was impressed by "the whole Charlie Manson package" of artist, life-stylist and philosopher, and he paid to record Manson's material. Wilson moved out of his rented home when the lease expired, and his landlord evicted the Family.

=== Spahn Ranch ===
In August 1968, Manson established a base for the Family at the Spahn Ranch after Wilson's landlord evicted them. It had been a television and movie set for Westerns, but the buildings had deteriorated by the time the Family first appeared at the property. By the late 1960s the ranch had derived revenue primarily from selling horseback rides. Female Family members did chores around the ranch and, occasionally, had sex on Manson's orders with the ranch's nearly blind 80-year-old owner, George Spahn. The women also acted as guides for him. In exchange, Spahn allowed Manson's group to live at the ranch for free. Lynette Fromme acquired the nickname "Squeaky" because she often squeaked when Spahn pinched her thigh.

Charles Watson, a small-town Texan who had quit college and moved to California, soon joined the group at the ranch and Spahn gave him the nickname "Tex", due to his accent.

== Encounter with Tate ==
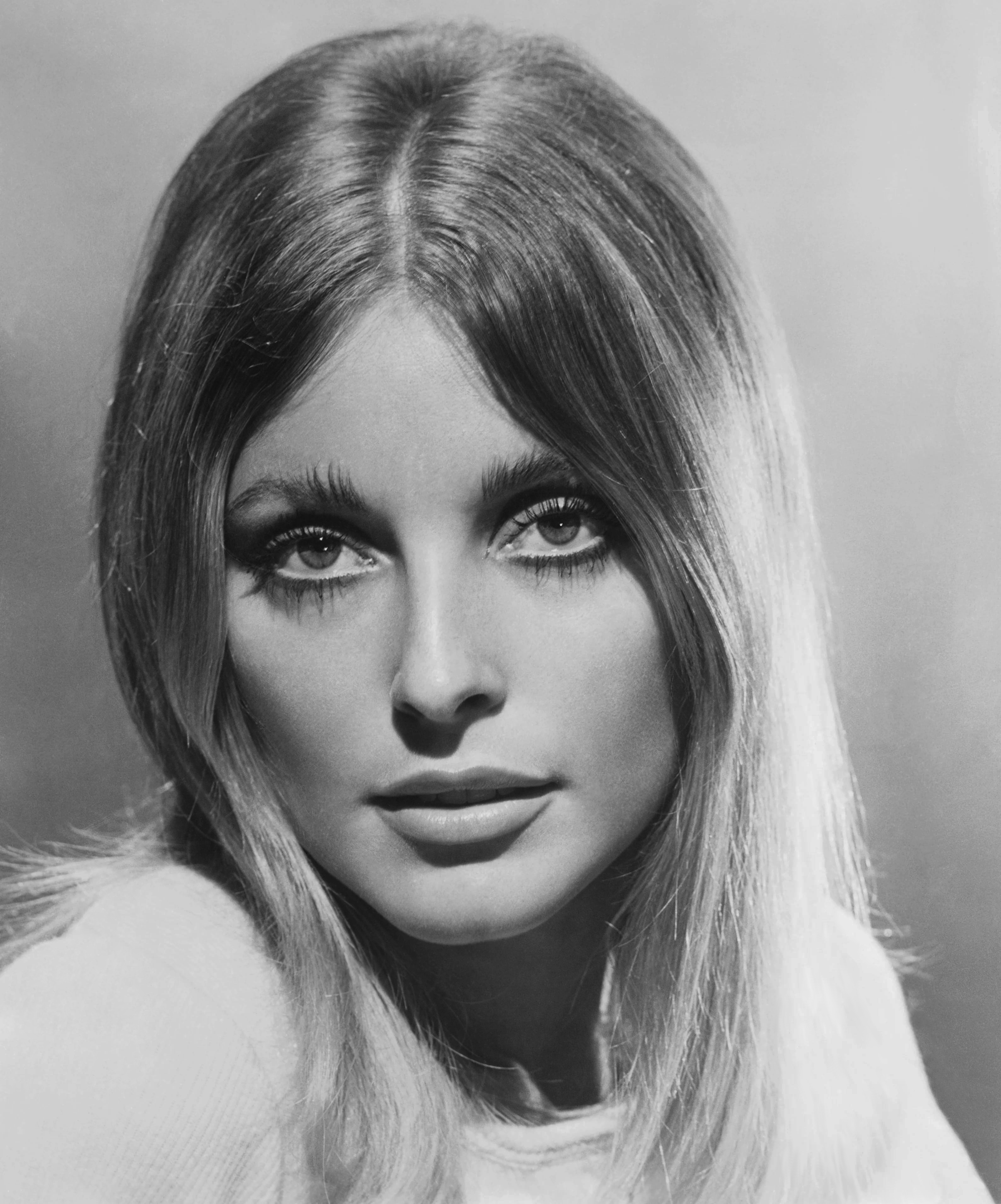
Sharon Tate in 1967

On March 23, 1969, Manson entered the grounds of 10050 Cielo Drive, which he had known as Melcher's residence. He was not invited.

As he approached the main house, Manson was met by Shahrokh Hatami, an Iranian photographer who had befriended Polanski and Tate during the making of the documentary Mia and Roman. He was there to photograph Tate before she departed for Rome the next day. Seeing Manson approach, Hatami went onto the front porch to ask him what he wanted.

Manson said that he was looking for someone whose name Hatami did not recognize. Hatami told him the place was the Polanski residence. He advised Manson to try "the back alley," by which he meant the path to the guest house beyond the main house. Concerned about the stranger, he went down the front walk to confront Manson. Tate appeared behind Hatami in the house's front door and asked him who was calling. Hatami said that a man was looking for someone. He and Tate maintained their positions while Manson went back to the guest house without a word, returned to the front a minute or two later, and left.

That evening, Manson returned to the property and again went to the guest house. He entered the enclosed porch and spoke with Altobelli, the owner, who had just come out of the shower. Manson asked for Melcher, but Altobelli felt that Manson was looking for him. It was later discovered that Manson had apparently been to the property on earlier occasions after Melcher left.

Altobelli told Manson through the screen door that Melcher had moved to Malibu and said that he did not know his new address, although he did. Altobelli said that he was in the entertainment business. He had met Manson the previous year at Wilson's home and was sure that Manson already knew that. At that meeting, he had given limited compliments to Manson on some of his musical recordings, which Wilson had been playing.

Altobelli told Manson he was leaving the country the next day, and Manson said he would like to speak with him upon his return. Altobelli said that he would be gone for more than a year. Manson said that he had been directed to the guest house by the persons in the main house; Altobelli asked Manson not to disturb his tenants.

Altobelli and Tate flew together to Rome the next day. Tate asked him whether "that creepy-looking guy" had gone to see him at the guest house the day before.

== Crimes ==
=== Crowe shooting ===
Bernard Crowe shooting
- Location: Franklin Garden Apartments, 6917–6933 Franklin Avenue, Los Angeles, California
- Date: July 1, 1969
- Attack type: Shooting
- Weapon: .22 caliber High Standard Buntline revolver
- Deaths: 0
- Injuries: 1
- Victim: Bernard "Lotsapoppa" Crowe
- Perpetrators: Charles Manson; accomplices – Tex Watson, Thomas "T.J." Walleman

Tex Watson became involved in drug dealing and robbed a drug dealer named Bernard "Lotsapoppa" Crowe. Crowe allegedly responded with a threat to kill everyone at Spahn Ranch. In response, Charles Manson shot Crowe on July 1, 1969, at Manson's Hollywood apartment.

Manson's belief that he had killed Crowe was seemingly confirmed by a news report of the discovery of the dumped body of a Black Panther in Los Angeles. Although Crowe was not a member of the Black Panthers, Manson concluded he had been and expected retaliation from the Panthers. He turned Spahn Ranch into a defensive camp, establishing night patrols by armed guards. Tex Watson would later write, "Blackie was trying to get at the chosen ones."

Manson brought in members of the Straight Satans Motorcycle Club to act as security. At this time, Bobby Beausoleil became more involved with the Family.

=== Hinman murder ===
Gary Hinman murder
- Location: 964 Old Topanga Canyon Road, Topanga, California
- Date: July 25, 1969– July 27, 1969 (Pacific Time Zone)
- Target: Gary Alan Hinman
- Attack type: Stabbing
- Deaths: 1
- Perpetrators: Bobby Beausoleil; accomplices – Susan Atkins, Mary Brunner, Charles Manson, Bruce M. Davis

Gary Alan Hinman (b. December 24, 1934 in Colorado) was a music teacher and PhD student at the University of California, Los Angeles (UCLA). At some point in the late 1960s, he befriended members of the Manson Family, allowing some to occasionally stay at his home. According to some people, including Family member Susan Atkins, Manson believed Hinman was wealthy. He sent Family members Bobby Beausoleil, Mary Brunner and Atkins to Hinman's home on July 25, 1969, to convince him to join the Family and turn over the assets Manson thought Hinman had inherited. The three held Hinman hostage for two days, as he denied having any money. During this time, Manson arrived with a sword and slashed Hinman's face and ear. After that, Beausoleil stabbed Hinman to death, allegedly on Manson's instruction. Before leaving the Topanga Canyon residence, Beausoleil or one of the women used Hinman's blood to write "Political piggy" on the wall and to draw a panther paw, a Black Panther symbol.

According to Manson and Beausoleil in magazine interviews of 1981 and 1998–1999, Beausoleil said he went to Hinman's to recover money paid to Hinman for mescaline provided to the Straight Satans that had supposedly been bad. Beausoleil added that Brunner and Atkins, unaware of his intent, went along to visit Hinman. Atkins, in her 1977 autobiography, wrote that Manson directed Beausoleil, Brunner, and her to go to Hinman's and get the supposed inheritance of $21,000. She said that two days earlier Manson had told her privately that, if she wanted to "do something important", she could kill Hinman and get his money.

Beausoleil was arrested on August 6, 1969, after he was caught driving Hinman's car. Police found the murder weapon in the tire well.

=== Murders of Tate, Sebring, Folger, Frykowski, and Parent ===
On the night of August 8, 1969, Manson directed Tex Watson to take Susan Atkins, Linda Kasabian, and Patricia Krenwinkel to Melcher's former home at 10050 Cielo Drive in Los Angeles. According to Watson, Manson told them to kill everyone there. The home had recently been rented to actress Sharon Tate and her husband, director Roman Polanski. (Polanski was away in Europe working on The Day of the Dolphin). Manson told the three women to do as Watson told them.

The Family members killed the five people they found: Sharon Tate (eight and a half months pregnant), who was living there at the time, Jay Sebring, Abigail Folger, and Wojciech Frykowski, who were visiting her, and Steven Parent, who had been visiting the caretaker of the home. Atkins wrote "pig" with Tate's blood on the front door as they left. The murders created a nationwide sensation.

=== Murder of Leno and Rosemary LaBianca ===
The night of August 9, 1969, seven Family members (Leslie Van Houten, Steve "Clem" Grogan, Charles Manson, and the four from the previous night) drove to the home of Leno and Rosemary LaBianca. Watson said that, having gone there alone, Manson returned to take him to the house with him. After Manson pointed through a window to a man sleeping in the living room, the two men entered the house through an unlocked back door. Watson bound the couple and covered their heads with pillowcases. Manson left, sending Krenwinkel and Van Houten into the house.

Watson sent the women to the bedroom where Rosemary had been bound. He began stabbing Leno with a bayonet in the living room. Going to the bedroom, Watson discovered Rosemary swinging a lamp at the Family women. He stabbed her with the bayonet, and returned to the living room to resume attacking Leno, whom he stabbed 12 times. Krenwinkel stabbed Rosemary. Watson told Van Houten to stab the woman, too, which she did. Krenwinkel used the LaBiancas' blood to write "Rise" and "Death to pigs" on the walls, and "Healter [sic] Skelter" on the refrigerator door.

Meanwhile, Manson directed Kasabian to drive to the home of an acquaintance of hers. Manson dropped off Kasabian, Grogan, and Atkins, and drove back to Spahn Ranch. Kasabian allegedly thwarted a murder by deliberately knocking on the wrong door.

=== Shea murder ===
In a 1971 trial that took place after his Tate–LaBianca convictions, Manson was found guilty of the murders of Gary Hinman and Donald "Shorty" Shea. He was given a life sentence. Shea was a Spahn Ranch stuntman and horse wrangler who had been killed approximately ten days after a sheriff's raid on the ranch which had been carried out on 16 August 1969. Manson, who suspected that Shea had helped set up the raid, apparently believed Shea was trying to get Spahn to run the Family off the ranch. Manson may have considered it a "sin" that Shea, a white man, had married a black woman. Furthermore, there was the possibility that Shea knew about the Tate–LaBianca killings. In separate trials, Family members Bruce Davis and Steve "Clem" Grogan were also found guilty of Shea's murder.

In 1977, authorities learned the exact location of the remains of Shorty Shea and, contrary to Family claims, also learned that Shea had not been dismembered and buried in several places. Contacting the prosecutor in his case, Steve Grogan told him Shea's corpse had been buried intact. Grogan drew a map that pinpointed the location, and the body was recovered. Of those convicted of Manson-ordered murders, Grogan would become, in 1985, the first one to be paroled.

=== Suspected further murders ===
In total, Manson and his followers were convicted of nine counts of first-degree murder. However, the LAPD believes that the Family could have claimed up to at least twelve more victims. Cliff Shepard, a former LAPD Robbery-Homicide Division detective, said that Manson "repeatedly" claimed to have killed many others. Prosecutor Stephen Kay supported this assertion: "I know that Manson one time told one of his cellmates that he was responsible for 35 murders." Tate's younger sister, Debra Tate, has also claimed that investigators are "just scraping the surface" when it comes to the number of Manson's victims and has further elaborated on how Manson sent her a taunting map of the Panamint Range, with crosses on it that she believed were meant to represent buried bodies. This has resulted in several excavations that have been undertaken at Manson's Barker Ranch, but they have not resulted in any bodies being found.

- Nancy Warren, 65, and Clyda Dulaney, 24, were both found near Ukiah, California at the antique store owned by Warren on October 13, 1968. They had both been beaten and strangled to death with thirty-six leather thongs. After the Family members were arrested, they became suspects when it was discovered that members of the Family had been in the Ukiah area at the time of the murders. However, no one in the Family was ever charged with the murders and no arrests were ever made in the case.
- Marina Elizabeth Habe, 17, was murdered on December 30, 1968. She was a student at the University of Hawaii home on vacation when she was murdered in Los Angeles. According to the autopsy report, Habe's throat had been slashed and she had received numerous knife wounds to the chest. She suffered multiple contusions to the face and throat, and had been garrotted. There was no evidence of rape. Habe was abducted outside the home of her mother in West Hollywood, 8962 Cynthia Avenue. A former Manson Family associate claimed members of the Family had known Habe and it was conjectured she had been one of their victims.
- Darwin Morell Scott, 64, was the uncle of Manson and the brother of Manson's father, Colonel Scott. On May 27, 1969, Scott was found brutally stabbed to death in his Ashland, Kentucky apartment. His body was pinned to the kitchen floor with a butcher knife, and he had been stabbed nineteen times. After Manson's arrest, it was reported that local residents claimed to have seen a man resembling Manson using the alias "Preacher" in the area at the time Darwin was murdered. Manson was on parole in California at the time of the murder, but the murder occurred when Manson was out of touch with his parole officers.
- Mark Walts, 16, was an acquaintance of the Family members and was even known to associate with them at the Spahn Ranch. On July 17, 1969, Walts hitchhiked to the Santa Monica Pier so he could go fishing. His fishing pole was found abandoned at the pier, and his body was found the next day near Mulholland Drive. He had been shot three times in the chest. Though the Family was reportedly "shocked" by Walts' murder, his brother was convinced that Manson was responsible for his death and even called him in order to directly accuse him of his murder. The Los Angeles Sheriff's Department investigated Spahn Ranch in regard to Walts' murder, but no links were found, and the murder was never solved.
- John Philip Haught, 22, was an Ohio native who had moved to California and met Manson in the summer of 1969. He joined the Manson Family and was amongst the group who was arrested in the October raid of the clan for the Tate-LaBianca murders; Manson suspected him of being an informant. On November 5, 1969, Haught was associating with some members of the Family. According to all present, Haught suddenly found a gun in the room, picked it up, and promptly shot himself while attempting a game of Russian roulette. However, when police investigated the death, they found that the gun, rather than having zero bullets and one spent shell casing, instead contained seven bullets and one spent shell. Moreover, the gun had been wiped free of prints. Additionally, a male witness who had held Haught's head after the shooting told Cohen he had entered the room to find a female Manson follower with the gun in her hand. Despite this, police concluded Haught had actually killed himself.
- James Sharp, 15, and Doreen Gaul, 19, were both found stabbed to death in an alley in Los Angeles on November 7, 1969. The murder of the two young Scientologists involved both being stabbed between fifty and sixty times. Police immediately noted the similarities to these murders and those of the Tate-LaBianca murders; the killings of Sharp and Gaul happened close to where the Labianca's lived. In Helter Skelter, author Vincent Bugliosi wrote that Gaul was rumoured to be a former girlfriend of Manson Family member Bruce Davis — Davis had lived at the same housing complex as Gaul, but in a police interview he denied knowing her.
- Reet Jurvetson, 19, was a young woman found stabbed to death on November 16, 1969. Her body was found with over one hundred and fifty stab wounds from a penknife to her neck and upper body, along with defensive wounds on her hands and arms. She had been disposed of along Mulholland Drive in Los Angeles, California. Some witnesses claimed to have seen a woman named "Sherry" who matched Jurvetson's description among members of the Manson Family, but it turned out that this individual was alive. Manson himself denied any involvement in killing Jurvetson. Detectives within the Los Angeles Police Department have noted "striking similarities" between the method of murder of both Jurvetson and Habe, but no firm connection between both murders has ever been established.
- Joel Pugh, 29, was found dead in the Talgarth Hotel in London, England, on December 1, 1969. His wrists had been cut and his throat was slit twice. British authorities listed the death a drug-induced suicide, saying Pugh had been depressed. Pugh was a Family member who was married to another member of the Family, Sandra Good. Stephen Kay and others claim Manson hated Pugh. "He had no reason to commit suicide, and Manson was very unhappy that Sandy was with Pugh", Kay has said. Pugh's death occurred when a number of Manson Family members were being arrested for the Tate-LaBianca murders. Manson follower Bruce Davis was in London at the time Pugh died.
- Ronald Hughes, 35, was an American attorney who represented Leslie Van Houten, a member of the Manson Family. Hughes disappeared while on a camping trip during a ten-day recess from the Tate-LaBianca murder trial in November 1970. The badly decomposed body of Hughes was found in March 1971 wedged between two boulders in Ventura County. It was rumoured, although never proven, that Hughes was murdered by the Family, possibly because he had stood up to Manson and refused to allow Van Houten to take the stand and absolve Manson of the crimes, though he might have perished in flooding. Attorney Stephen Kay has stated that while he is "on the fence" about the Family's involvement in Hughes' death, Manson had open contempt for Hughes during the trial. Kay added, "The last thing Manson said to him [Hughes] was, 'I don't want to see you in the courtroom again,' and he was never seen again alive." Family member Sandra Good stated that Hughes was "the first of the retaliation murders".
- On November 8, 1972, the body of 26-year-old Vietnam Marine combat veteran James Lambert Willett was found by a hiker near Guerneville, California. Months earlier, he had been forced to dig his own grave, and then was shot and poorly buried. His station wagon was found outside a house in Stockton where several Manson followers were living, including Priscilla Cooper, Lynette Fromme, and Nancy Pitman. Police forced their way into the house and arrested several of the people there. The body of Willett's 19-year-old wife Lauren Chavelle Willett was found buried in the basement. She had been killed very recently by a gunshot to the head, in what the Family members initially claimed was an accident. It was later suggested that she was killed out of fear that she would reveal who killed her husband. Michael Monfort pleaded guilty to murdering Lauren and Priscilla Cooper, James Craig, and Nancy Pitman pleaded guilty as accessories after the fact. Monfort and William Goucher later pleaded guilty to the murder of James, and James Craig pleaded guilty as an accessory after the fact. The group had been living in the house with the Willetts while committing various robberies. Shortly after killing Willett, Monfort had used Willett's identification papers to pose as Willett after being arrested for an armed robbery of a liquor store. Willett was not involved in the robberies and wanted to move away but was presumably killed out of fear that he would talk to police.
- Laurence Merrick, 50, was an American film director and author. He is best known for co-directing the Oscar nominated documentary Manson in 1973. Sharon Tate was a former student at Merrick's Academy of Dramatic Arts. Merrick was killed by a gunman on January 26, 1977. He was shot in the back in the carpark of his acting school. Merrick's murder went unsolved until October 1981 when 35-year-old Dennis Mignano confessed to police. At his subsequent trial, Mignano was found not guilty by reason of insanity and committed to a mental hospital. Mignano was an unemployed would-be actor and singer with a long history of psychiatric problems and a possible prior relationship with the Manson clan.
- Six months after the murder of Merrick, Mignano's sister Michele Mignano, 21, a topless dancer, was also murdered. Her body was found on June 13, 1977, 350 ft into a Western Pacific railroad tunnel in Niles Canyon. Authorities referred to her death as an "execution-style slaying" with her dying from exsanguination due to multiple gunshot wounds. A number of bullet cartridges were found near her body. She was shoeless yet fully clothed with jewellery so sexual assault and robbery were both ruled out as motives. Her murder has never been solved.

=== Possible murder motives ===
At trial and in later best-sellers, prosecutor Vincent Bugliosi argued that the murders were intended to promote a race war called "Helter Skelter". Others argue the murders were simply an attempt to free family member Bobby Beausoleil, who had been arrested for the murder of Gary Hinman, by creating copycat crimes to convince authorities that Hinman's real murderers were still at large. Others suggest that the murders were about drugs or intimidation of Terry Melcher.

==== Helter Skelter ====
In November 1968, the Family had established headquarters in Death Valley's environs, at the Myers and Barker ranches. The former was owned by the grandmother of Family member Catherine Gillies.

According to Charles Watson and Paul Watkins, Manson and Watson visited an acquaintance who played the Beatles' double album, The Beatles, and became obsessed with the group.

Watkins claimed Manson had been saying that racial tensions between Blacks and Whites were about to erupt, predicted that Black Americans would rise up in rebellion, and that The Beatles' songs foretold it all in code.

According to Watkins, by February, the Family would create an album whose songs would trigger the predicted chaos. Murders of Whites by Blacks would be met with retaliation. A split between racist and non-racist Whites would result in the Whites' self-annihilation.

==== Copycat ====
According to Family members Susan Atkins, Patricia Krenwinkel, Leslie Van Houten, Bobby Beausoleil, and others, the arrest of Beausoleil for the torture and murder of Gary Hinman was the catalyst for the Family's ensuing murder spree. They wanted to convince police that the killer(s) of Hinman were still at large. Truman Capote's interviews of Beausoleil, and that by Ann Louise Bardach in November 1981, affirmed this account.

Charlie Guenther, a police detective who investigated the murders, said of Beausoleil, "He called the [Spahn] Ranch after he was arrested. The sole motive for those murders was to get Bobby out of jail." Bugliosi's co-prosecutor Aaron Stovitz said he believed the motive for the Tate–LaBianca murders was as copycat murders after Hinman.

==== Drugs ====
Other people suggested the motive was related to the drug dealing by Jay Sebring and Wojciech Frykowski, and their connection with Charles Watson and Manson, and a bad drug deal. For instance, Sebring's protégé Jim Markham believes the murders were in response to a bad drug deal the day before, in which Manson went to Tate's house to sell marijuana and cocaine to Sebring and Frykowski. Instead, the two men attacked and beat Manson. In an interview with police, Frykowski's friend Witold Kaczanowski said that Frykowski had been involved with many criminals and the drug trade. In his later interview with Truman Capote, Bobby Beausoleil said, "They burned people on dope deals. Sharon Tate and that gang."

Ed Sanders and Paul Krassner uncovered information that Joel Rostau, the boyfriend of Sebring's receptionist, had delivered mescaline and cocaine to Sebring and Frykowski at Tate's house a few hours before the murders. During the Manson trial, Rostau and other associates of Sebring were murdered.

==== Terry Melcher ====
In 1968, musician Dennis Wilson introduced record producer Terry Melcher to Manson. For a time, Melcher was interested in recording Manson's music, as well as making a film about the family and their hippie commune existence. Manson met Melcher at 10050 Cielo Drive, a house that Melcher shared with his girlfriend, actress Candice Bergen, and musician Mark Lindsay.

Manson eventually auditioned for Melcher, but Melcher declined to sign him. There was still talk of a documentary being made about Manson's music, but Melcher abandoned the project after witnessing Manson fighting with a drunken stuntman at Spahn Ranch. Wilson and Melcher severed their ties with Manson, a move that angered Manson. Soon after, Melcher and Bergen moved out of the Cielo Drive home. The house's owner, Rudi Altobelli, then leased it to film director Roman Polanski and his wife, actress Sharon Tate. Manson was reported to have visited the house on more than one occasion asking for Melcher, but was told that Melcher had moved.

Some authors and law enforcement personnel have theorized that the Cielo Drive house was targeted by Manson as revenge for Melcher's rejection and that Manson was unaware that he and Bergen had moved out. However, family member Charles "Tex" Watson stated that Manson and company did, in fact, know that Melcher was no longer living there, and Melcher's former roommate Mark Lindsay stated, "Terry and I talked about it later and Terry said Manson knew (Melcher had moved) because Manson or someone from his organization left a note on Terry's porch in Malibu."

The Manson murders reportedly prompted Melcher to go into seclusion. When Manson was arrested, it was widely reported that he had sent his followers to the house to kill Melcher and Bergen. Manson family member Susan Atkins, who admitted her part in the murders, stated to police and before a grand jury that the house was chosen as the scene for the murders "to instill fear into Terry Melcher because Terry had given us his word on a few things and never came through with them". Melcher took to employing a bodyguard and told Manson prosecutor Vincent Bugliosi that his fear was so great he had been undergoing psychiatric treatment. Melcher was described as the most frightened of the witnesses at the trial, even though Bugliosi assured him that "Manson knew you were no longer living [on Cielo Drive]".

In his 2019 book CHAOS: Charles Manson, the CIA, and the Secret History of the Sixties, Tom O'Neil reexamined the Manson case and found evidence Melcher may have been more closely involved with the Manson family than he admitted at trial. In reviewing police files and other data, O'Neill found evidence Melcher was associating with Manson in the four month period after the Tate-Labianca murders but before Manson's arrest. These documents, seemingly hidden by Bugliosi, undermined claims the Tate murders were intended to frighten Melcher in revenge for his refusal to record Manson's music. O'Neill also found documents indicating Melcher was having sex with 15-year-old Manson family member Ruth Ann Moorehouse. Dean Moorehouse, Ruth Ann's father and a Manson Family member, also had resided at 10050 Cielo Drive with Melcher. Tex Watson would also frequently visit the residence.

== Investigation and trial ==
=== Investigation ===
The Tate murders became national news on August 9, 1969. The Polanskis' housekeeper, Winifred Chapman, had discovered the murder scene when she arrived for work that morning. On August 10, detectives of the Los Angeles County Sheriff's Department, which had jurisdiction in the Hinman case, informed Los Angeles Police Department (LAPD) detectives assigned to the Tate case of the bloody writing at the Hinman house. According to Vincent Bugliosi, because detectives believed the Tate murders were a consequence of a drug transaction, the Tate team initially ignored this and other evidence of similarities between the crimes. The Tate autopsies were underway before the LaBianca bodies were discovered.

During the Tate autopsies, detectives working on the Gary Hinman case noticed similarities in the weapons used, the stab wounds, and the writing in blood on the walls. They also thought the case had something to do with narcotics. They brought the information to detectives working on the Tate murders. According to Detective Charlie Guenther, "Vince [Bugliosi] didn't want anything to do with the Hinman case. Hinman was a nothing case. Vince didn't want to prosecute it."

Steven Parent, who was fatally shot in the Tate/Polanski driveway, was found to have been an acquaintance of William Garretson, the caretaker who lived in the guest house. Garretson had been hired by Rudi Altobelli to take care of the property while Altobelli was away. The killers encountered Parent when he was leaving after he had visited Garretson.

Held briefly as a Tate suspect, Garretson told police he had neither seen nor heard anything on the murder night. He was released on August 11, 1969, after undergoing a polygraph examination that indicated he had not been involved in the crimes.

The LaBianca crime scene was discovered at about 10:30 p.m. on August 10, approximately 19 hours after the murders were committed. Fifteen-year-old Frank Struthers, Rosemary's son from a prior marriage and Leno's stepson, returned from a camping trip and was concerned to see all of the window shades of his home drawn and his stepfather's speedboat still attached to the family car, parked in the driveway. He called his older sister and her boyfriend. The boyfriend, Joe Dorgan, accompanied the younger Struthers into the house, where they discovered Leno's body. They called the police, who found Rosemary's body after officers arrived at the house.

On August 12, 1969, the LAPD told the press it had ruled out any connection between the Tate and LaBianca homicides. On August 16, the sheriff's office raided Spahn Ranch and arrested Manson and 25 others, as "suspects in a major auto theft ring" that had been stealing Volkswagen Beetles and converting them into dune buggies. Weapons were seized, but, because the search warrant had been misdated, the group was released a few days later.

In a report at the end of August, the LaBianca detectives noted a possible connection between the bloody writings at the LaBianca house and "the singing group the Beatles' most recent album."

==== Breakthrough ====
Still working separately from the Tate team, the LaBianca team checked with the sheriff's office in mid-October about possible similar crimes. They learned of the Hinman case. They also learned that the Hinman detectives had spoken with Beausoleil's girlfriend, Kitty Lutesinger. She had been arrested a few days earlier with members of "the Manson Family".

The arrests, for car thefts, had taken place at the desert ranches to which the Family had moved. Unknown to authorities, its members had been searching Death Valley for a hole in the ground, what they believed was access to the Bottomless Pit. A joint force of National Park Service Rangers and officers from the California Highway Patrol and the Inyo County Sheriff's Office: federal, state, and county personnel, had raided both the Myers and Barker ranches after following evidence left when Family members had burned an earthmover owned by Death Valley National Monument. The raiders had found stolen dune buggies and other vehicles, and had arrested two dozen people, including Manson. A Highway Patrol officer found Manson hiding in a cabinet beneath Barker's bathroom sink. The officers had no idea that the people they were arresting were involved with the murders in Los Angeles.

Following up leads a month after they had spoken with Lutesinger, LaBianca detectives contacted members of a motorcycle gang Manson tried to recruit as bodyguards while the Family was at Spahn Ranch. While the gang members were providing information that suggested a link between Manson and the Tate/LaBianca murders, a dormitory mate of Susan Atkins informed LAPD of the Family's involvement in the crimes. Atkins was booked for the Hinman murder after she told sheriff's detectives that she had been involved in it. Transferred to Sybil Brand Institute, a detention center in Monterey Park, California, she had begun talking to bunkmates Ronnie Howard and Virginia Graham, to whom she gave accounts of the events in which she had been involved.

==== Apprehension ====
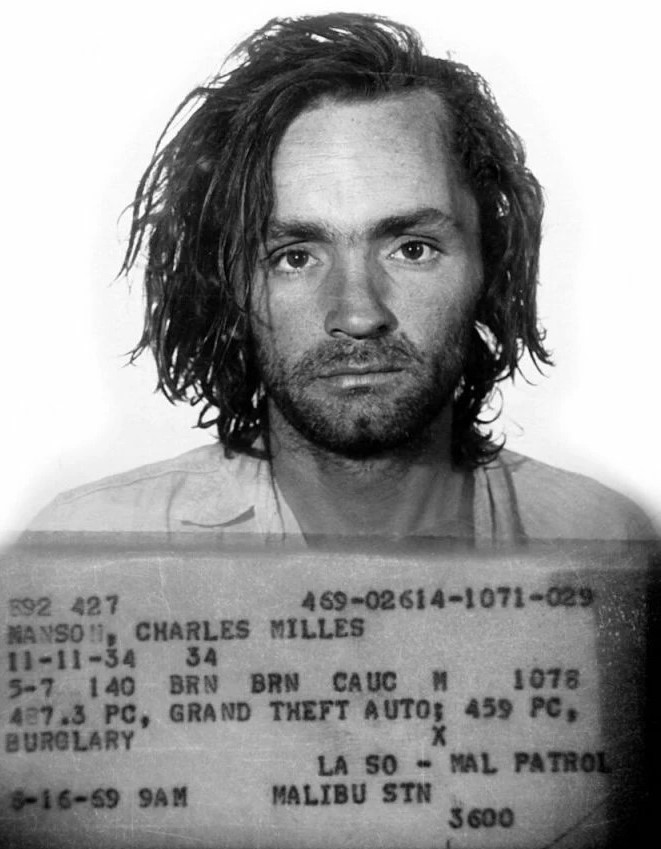
County Sheriff mugshot of Manson August 16, 1969. He was arrested on suspicion of car theft. Those charges were later dropped on account of a misdated warrant.

On December 1, 1969, acting on the information from these sources, LAPD announced warrants for the arrest of Watson, Krenwinkel, and Kasabian in the Tate case; the suspects' involvement in the LaBianca murders was noted. Manson and Atkins, already in custody, were not mentioned; the connection between the LaBianca case and Van Houten, who was also among those arrested near Death Valley, had not yet been recognized.

Watson and Krenwinkel were already under arrest, with authorities in McKinney, Texas and Mobile, Alabama having picked them up on notice from LAPD. Informed that a warrant was out for her arrest, Kasabian voluntarily surrendered to authorities in Concord, New Hampshire on December 2.

Before long, physical evidence such as Krenwinkel's and Watson's fingerprints, which had been collected by LAPD at Cielo Drive, was augmented by evidence recovered by the public. On September 1, 1969, the distinctive .22-caliber Hi Standard "Buntline Special" revolver Watson used on Parent, Sebring, and Frykowski had been found and given to the police by Steven Weiss, a 10-year-old who lived near the Tate residence. In mid-December, when the Los Angeles Times published a crime account based on information Susan Atkins had given her attorney, Weiss's father made several phone calls which finally prompted LAPD to locate the gun in its evidence file and connect it with the murders via ballistics tests.

Acting on that same newspaper account, a local ABC television crew quickly located and recovered the bloody clothing discarded by the Tate killers. The knives discarded en route from the Tate residence were never recovered, despite a search by some of the same crewmen and months later by LAPD. A knife found behind the cushion of a chair in the Tate living room was apparently that of Susan Atkins, who lost her knife in the course of the attack.

=== Trial ===
The People v. Charles Manson et al.
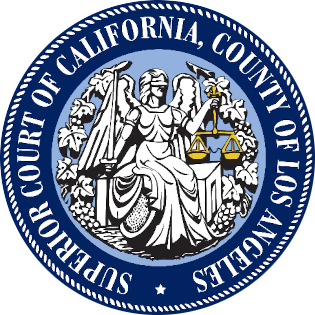
- Court: Los Angeles County Superior Court
- Full case name: The People of the State of California vs. Charles Manson, Patricia Krenwinkel, and Susan Atkins
- Decided: January 25, 1971

Case history
- Appealed to: Supreme Court of California

Court membership
- Judge sitting: Charles H. Older

Case opinions
- Vogel, J., with Thompson, J., concurring. Separate concurring and dissenting opinion by Wood, P. J
- Decision by: Jury

The trial began June 15, 1970. The prosecution's main witness was Kasabian, who along with Manson, Atkins, and Krenwinkel had been charged with seven counts of murder and one of conspiracy. Since Kasabian, by all accounts, had not participated in the killings, she was granted immunity in exchange for testimony that detailed the nights of the crimes. Originally, a deal had been made with Atkins in which the prosecution agreed not to seek the death penalty against her in exchange for her grand jury testimony on which the indictments were secured; once Atkins repudiated that testimony, the deal was withdrawn. Because Van Houten had participated only in the LaBianca killings, she was charged with two counts of murder and one of conspiracy.

Originally, Judge William Keene had reluctantly granted Manson permission to act as his own attorney. Because of Manson's conduct, including violations of a gag order and submission of "outlandish" and "nonsensical" pretrial motions, the permission was withdrawn before the trial's start. Manson filed an affidavit of prejudice against Keene, who was replaced by Judge Charles Older. On Friday, July 24, the first day of testimony, Manson appeared in court with an X carved into his forehead. He issued a statement that he was "considered inadequate and incompetent to speak or defend [him]self"—and had "X'd [him]self from [the establishment's] world." Over the following weekend, the female defendants duplicated the mark on their own foreheads, as did most Family members within another day or so.

The prosecution argued that triggering the "Helter Skelter" scenario was Manson's main motive. Present at the crime scene were the words "PIGS" and "HEALTER SKELTER" [sic] written in blood by Susan Atkins, a reference to the Beatles' song "Helter Skelter" from their 1968 album. These messages correlated with testimony about Manson's predictions that Black people would murder white people and write similar warnings in blood at the outset of Helter Skelter. The defendants testified that the writing on the walls was to imitate the Hinman murder scene, not an apocalyptic race war.

According to Bugliosi, Manson directed Kasabian to hide a wallet taken from the scene in the women's restroom of a service station near a Black neighborhood. However, as co-prosecutor Stephen Kay later pointed out the wallet was actually left about 20 miles away in a predominantly White neighborhood, Sylmar.

==== Ongoing disruptions ====
During the trial, Family members loitered near the entrances and corridors of the courthouse. To keep them out of the courtroom proper, the prosecution subpoenaed them as prospective witnesses, who would not be able to enter while others were testifying. When the group established itself in vigil on the sidewalk, some members wore sheathed hunting knives that, although in plain view, were carried legally. Each of them was also identifiable by the X on their forehead.

Some Family members attempted to dissuade witnesses from testifying. Prosecution witnesses Paul Watkins and Juan Flynn were both threatened; Watkins was badly burned in a suspicious fire in his van. Former Family member Barbara Hoyt, who had overheard Susan Atkins describing the Tate murders to Family member Ruth Ann Moorehouse, agreed to accompany the latter to Hawaii. There, Moorehouse allegedly gave her a hamburger spiked with several doses of LSD. Found sprawled on a Honolulu curb in a drugged semi-stupor, Hoyt was taken to the hospital, where she did her best to identify herself as a witness in the Tate–LaBianca murder trial. Before the incident, Hoyt had been a reluctant witness; after the attempt to silence her, her reticence disappeared.

On August 4, despite precautions taken by the court, Manson flashed the jury a Los Angeles Times front page whose headline was "Manson Guilty, Nixon Declares". This was a reference to a statement made the previous day when U.S. President Richard Nixon had decried what he saw as the media's glamorization of Manson. Voir dired by Judge Charles Older, the jurors contended that the headline had not influenced them. The next day, the female defendants stood up and said in unison that, in light of Nixon's remark, there was no point in going on with the trial.

On October 5, Manson was denied the court's permission to question a prosecution witness whom defense attorneys had declined to cross-examine. Leaping over the defense table, Manson attempted to attack the judge. Wrestled to the ground by bailiffs, he was removed from the courtroom with the female defendants, who had subsequently risen and begun chanting in Latin. Thereafter, Older allegedly began wearing a revolver under his robes.

==== Defense rests ====
On November 16, the prosecution rested its case. Three days later, after arguing standard dismissal motions, the defense stunned the court by resting as well, without calling a single witness. Shouting their disapproval, Atkins, Krenwinkel, and Van Houten demanded their right to testify.

In chambers, the women's lawyers told the judge their clients wanted to testify that they had planned and committed the crimes and that Manson had not been involved. By resting their case, the defense lawyers had tried to stop this; Van Houten's attorney, Ronald Hughes, vehemently stated that he would not "push a client out the window". In the prosecutor's view, it was Manson who was advising the women to testify in this way as a means of saving himself. Speaking about the trial in a 1987 documentary, Krenwinkel said, "The entire proceedings were scripted—by Charlie."

The next day, Manson testified. The jury was removed from the courtroom. According to Vincent Bugliosi it was to make sure Manson's address did not violate the California Supreme Court's decision in People v. Aranda by making statements implicating his co-defendants. However, Bugliosi argued Manson would use his hypnotic powers to unfairly influence the jury. Speaking for more than an hour, Manson said, among other things, that "the music is telling the youth to rise up against the establishment." He said, "Why blame it on me? I didn't write the music." "To be honest with you," Manson also stated, "I don't recall ever saying 'Get a knife and a change of clothes and go do what Tex says.'"

As the body of the trial concluded and with the closing arguments impending, defense attorney Hughes disappeared during a weekend trip. When Maxwell Keith was appointed to represent Van Houten in Hughes' absence, a delay of more than two weeks was required to permit Keith to familiarize himself with the voluminous trial transcripts. No sooner had the trial resumed, just before Christmas, than disruptions of the prosecution's closing argument by the defendants led Older to ban the four defendants from the courtroom for the remainder of the guilt phase. This may have occurred because the defendants were acting in collusion with each other and were simply putting on a performance, which Older said was becoming obvious.

==== Conviction and penalty phase ====
On January 25, 1971, the jury returned guilty verdicts against the four defendants on each of the 27 separate counts against them. Not far into the trial's penalty phase, the jurors saw, at last, the defense that Manson—in the prosecution's view—had planned to present. Atkins, Krenwinkel, and Van Houten testified the murders had been conceived as "copycat" versions of the Hinman murder, for which Atkins now took credit. The killings, they said, were intended to draw suspicion away from Bobby Beausoleil by resembling the crime for which he had been jailed. This plan had supposedly been the work of, and carried out under the guidance of, not Manson, but someone allegedly in love with Beausoleil—Linda Kasabian. Among the narrative's weak points was the inability of Atkins to explain why, as she was maintaining, she had written "political piggy" at the Hinman house in the first place.

Midway through the penalty phase, Manson shaved his head and trimmed his beard to a fork; he told the press, "I am the Devil, and the Devil always has a bald head." In what the prosecution regarded as belated recognition on their part that imitation of Manson only proved his domination, the female defendants refrained from shaving their heads until the jurors retired to weigh the state's request for the death penalty.

The effort to exonerate Manson via the "copycat" scenario failed. On March 29, 1971, the jury returned verdicts of death against all four defendants on all counts. On April 19, 1971, Judge Older sentenced the four to death.

== Aftermath ==
=== 1970s–1980s ===
Watson returned to McKinney, Texas after the Tate–LaBianca murders. He was arrested in Texas on November 30, 1969, after local police were notified by California investigators that his fingerprints were found to match a print found on the front door of the Tate home. Watson fought extradition to California long enough that he was not included among the three defendants tried with Manson. The trial commenced in August 1971; by October, he, too, had been found guilty on seven counts of murder and one of conspiracy. Unlike the others, Watson presented a psychiatric defense; prosecutor Vincent Bugliosi made short work of Watson's insanity claims. Like his co-conspirators, Watson was sentenced to death.

In February 1972, the death sentences of all five parties were automatically reduced to life in prison by People v. Anderson, 493 P.2d 880, 6 Cal. 3d 628 (Cal. 1972), in which the California Supreme Court abolished the death penalty in that state. After his return to prison, Manson's rhetoric and hippie speeches held little sway. Though he found temporary acceptance from the Aryan Brotherhood, his role was submissive to a sexually aggressive member of the group at San Quentin.

Before the conclusion of Manson's Tate–LaBianca trial, a reporter for the Los Angeles Times tracked down Manson's mother, remarried and living in the Pacific Northwest. The former Kathleen Maddox claimed that, in childhood, her son had suffered no neglect; he had even been "pampered by all the women who surrounded him".

==== Remaining in view ====
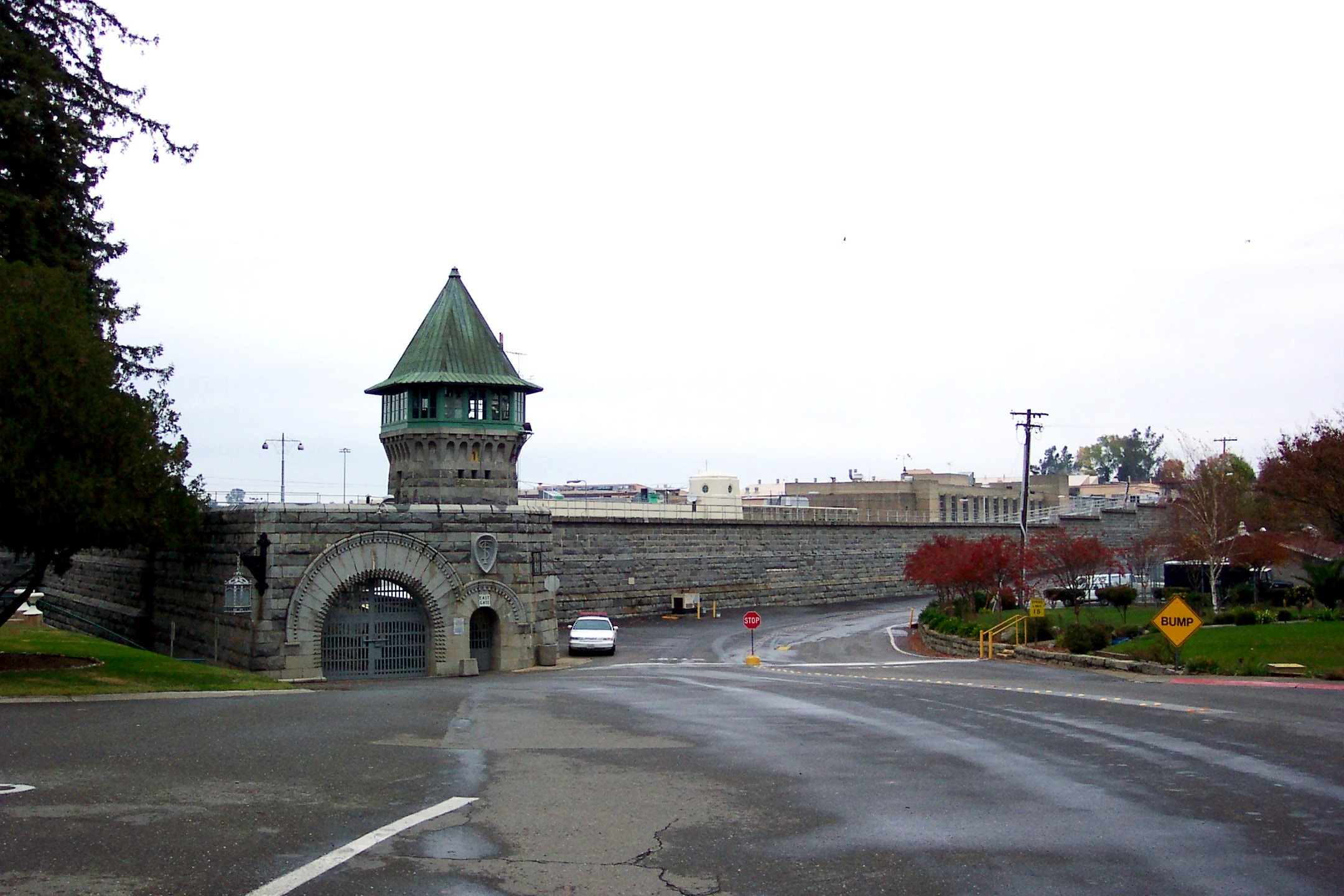
The Folsom State Prison, one of the facilities where Manson was held

On September 5, 1975, the Family returned to national attention when Squeaky Fromme attempted to assassinate U.S. President Gerald Ford. The attempt took place in Sacramento, to which she and fellow Manson follower Sandra Good had moved so that they could be near Manson while he was incarcerated at Folsom State Prison. A subsequent search of the apartment shared by Fromme, Good, and another Family recruit turned up evidence that, coupled with later actions on the part of Good, resulted in Good's conviction for conspiring to send threatening communications through the United States mail service and for transmitting death threats by way of interstate commerce. The threats involved corporate executives and U.S. government officials vis-à-vis supposed environmental dereliction on their part. Fromme was sentenced to 15 years to life, becoming the first person sentenced under United States Code Title 18, chapter 84 (1965), which made it a Federal crime to attempt to assassinate the President of the United States.

In December 1987, Fromme, serving a life sentence for the assassination attempt, escaped briefly from Federal Prison Camp, Alderson in West Virginia. She was trying to reach Manson because she heard that he had testicular cancer; she was apprehended within days. She was released on parole from Federal Medical Center, Carswell on August 14, 2009.

=== 1980–present ===
Steve "Clem" Grogan was paroled in 1985.

In a 1994 conversation with Manson prosecutor Vincent Bugliosi, Catherine Share, a one-time Manson follower, stated that her testimony in the penalty phase of Manson's trial had been a fabrication intended to save Manson from the gas chamber and that it had been given under Manson's explicit direction. Share's testimony had introduced the copycat-motive story, which the testimony of the three female defendants echoed and according to which the Tate–LaBianca murders had been Linda Kasabian's idea. In a 1997 segment of the tabloid television program Hard Copy, Share implied that her testimony had been given under a Manson threat of physical harm. In August 1971, after Manson's trial and sentencing, Share had participated in a violent California retail store robbery, the object of which was the acquisition of weapons to help free Manson.

In January 1996, a Manson website was established by latter-day Manson follower George Stimson, who was helped by Sandra Good. Good had been released from prison in 1985, after serving 10 years of her 15-year sentence for the death threats.

In a 1998–1999 interview in Seconds magazine, Bobby Beausoleil rejected the view that Manson ordered him to kill Gary Hinman. He stated that Manson did come to Hinman's house and slash Hinman with a sword, which he had previously denied in a 1981 interview with Oui magazine. Beausoleil stated that when he read about the Tate murders in the newspaper, "I wasn't even sure at that point—really, I had no idea who had done it until Manson's group were actually arrested for it. It had only crossed my mind and I had a premonition, perhaps. There was some little tickle in my mind that the killings might be connected with them ..." In the Oui magazine interview, he had stated, "When the Tate–LaBianca murders happened, I knew who had done it. I was fairly certain."

William Garretson, once the young caretaker at 10050 Cielo Drive, indicated in a program (The Last Days of Sharon Tate) broadcast on July 25, 1999 on E!, that he had, in fact, seen and heard a portion of the Tate murders from his location in the property's guest house. This corroborated the unofficial results of the polygraph examination that had been given to Garretson on August 10, 1969, and that had effectively eliminated him as a suspect. The LAPD officer who conducted the examination had concluded Garretson was "clean" on participation in the crimes but "muddy" as to his having heard anything.

It was announced in early 2008 that Susan Atkins was suffering from brain cancer. An application for compassionate release, based on her health status, was denied in July 2008, and she was denied parole for the 18th and final time on September 2, 2009. Atkins died of natural causes 22 days later, on September 24, 2009, at the Central California Women's facility in Chowchilla.

In a January 2008 segment of the Discovery Channel's Most Evil, Barbara Hoyt said that the impression that she had accompanied Ruth Ann Moorehouse to Hawaii just to avoid testifying at Manson's trial was erroneous. Hoyt said she had cooperated with the Family because she was "trying to keep them from killing my family". She stated that, at the time of the trial, she was "constantly being threatened: 'Your family's gonna die. [The murders] could be repeated at your house.'"

On March 15, 2008, the Associated Press reported that forensic investigators had conducted a search for human remains at Barker Ranch the previous month. Following up on longstanding rumors that the Family had killed hitchhikers and runaways who had come into its orbit during its time at Barker, the investigators identified "two likely clandestine grave sites ... and one additional site that merits further investigation." Though they recommended digging, CNN reported on March 28 that the Inyo County sheriff, who questioned the methods they employed with search dogs, had ordered additional tests before any excavation. On May 9, after a delay caused by damage to test equipment, the sheriff announced that test results had been inconclusive and that "exploratory excavation" would begin on May 20. In the meantime, Charles "Tex" Watson had commented publicly that "no one was killed" at the desert camp during the month and a half he was there, after the Tate–LaBianca murders. On May 21, after two days of work, the sheriff brought the search to an end; four potential gravesites had been dug up and had been found to hold no human remains.

In September 2009, The History Channel broadcast a docudrama covering the Family's activities and the murders as part of its coverage on the 40th anniversary of the killings. The program included an in-depth interview with Linda Kasabian, who spoke publicly for the first time since a 1989 appearance on A Current Affair, an American television news magazine. Also included in the History Channel program were interviews with Vincent Bugliosi, Catherine Share, and Debra Tate, sister of Sharon.

As the 40th anniversary of the Tate–LaBianca murders approached, in July 2009, Los Angeles magazine published an "oral history" in which former Family members, law enforcement officers, and others involved with Manson, the arrests, and the trials offered their recollections of—and observations on—the events that made Manson notorious. In the article, Juan Flynn, a Spahn Ranch worker who had become associated with Manson and the Family, said, "Charles Manson got away with everything. People will say, 'He's in jail.' But Charlie is exactly where he wants to be."

Charles Manson died of a heart attack and complications from colon cancer on November 19, 2017. He was 83 years old.

Bobby Beausoleil was recommended parole by the California Board of Parole in 2019, at his nineteenth hearing, but California Governor Gavin Newsom denied parole.

Leslie Van Houten was released on parole on July 11, 2023, at the age of 73.

Patricia Krenwinkel was granted parole by the board on May 26, 2022, but on October 14, 2022, Governor Gavin Newsom reversed the decision, citing the continued threat she would pose to society if released. Krenwinkel remains incarcerated at the California Institution for Women in Chino, California. In 2025, she was recommended to be released on parole but the recommendation was again rejected by Newsom.

Tex Watson has been denied parole 18 times since he gained eligibility in 1976, including two stipulations. In an October 2021 parole board hearing, he was given a five-year denial of parole. He remains incarcerated at Richard J. Donovan Correctional Facility in San Diego County, California.

== See also ==
- Counterculture of the 1960s
