= Mary Brunner =

American convicted criminal

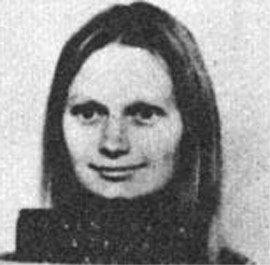
- Mary Brunner in a 1968 mugshot
- Born: Mary Theresa Brunner; December 17, 1943 (age 82); Eau Claire, Wisconsin, U.S.
- Other names: Marioche; Och; Mother Mary; Mary Manson; Linda Dee Manson; Christine Marie Euchts
- Children: 1
- Status: Paroled in 1977
- Criminal charges: Armed robbery Credit card theft Indecent exposure
- Penalty: 20 years to life imprisonment; paroled in 1977

Mary Theresa Brunner (born December 17, 1943) is an American criminal and former member of the "Manson Family" who was present during the 1969 murder of Gary Hinman, a California musician and Ph.D. candidate. She was arrested for numerous offenses, including credit card theft and armed robbery, and served a prison sentence at the California Institution for Women before being paroled in 1977.

== Meeting Charles Manson ==
Brunner was born in Eau Claire, Wisconsin to George and Elsie Brunner. She moved to California upon graduating from the University of Wisconsin–Madison in 1965 and took a job as library assistant at University of California, Berkeley. In the spring of 1967 she met 33-year-old career criminal Charles Manson who had been released from Terminal Island prison several weeks earlier. She let him stay at her apartment and the two became lovers after several weeks. She was thus the first person whom Manson recruited into his "Family". She quit her job and the two began to drift around California in a van meeting other young women.

Brunner and Manson met 18-year-old Lynette Fromme in Venice, California, and the three began living together in a rented house at 636 Cole Street in San Francisco. Over the course of the following two years, the Family enlarged to include between 20 and 30 individuals living communally; some, such as Brunner and Fromme, became ardent followers of Manson while other young people drifted in and out of the group.

Brunner became pregnant by Manson during the summer of 1967 and on April 15, 1968, gave birth to a son,Valentine Michael, nicknamed "Pooh Bear". The Family were living in a condemned house in Topanga Canyon, and several of the young women assisted the birth. She acquired a number of aliases and nicknames, including "Marioche", "Och", "Mother Mary", "Mary Manson", "Linda Dee Manson", and "Christine Marie Euchts".

The Manson group traveled along the California coast and made excursions to Washington state, Oregon, and Nevada. The ever-growing group of young women and men eventually settled down at the Spahn Ranch, an occasional film set and location operated by George Spahn near the Los Angeles suburb of Chatsworth.

Manson ostensibly based his commune on principles of freedom and love, but he exerted dictatorial control, ordering the women to have sex with Spahn and others. Manson sent his female followers to the city on criminal activities, such as theft and fraud. He also had illegal firearms and played host to a motorcycle gang.

== Early arrests ==
On April 21, 1968, Brunner and Family members Manson, Susan Atkins, Ella Jo Bailey, Dianne Elizabeth Lake, Nancy Laura Pitman, Bruce Van Hall, Marcus John Arneson and Suzanne Scott were arrested near Little Sycamore Canyon, in southern Ventura County, California. They were found sprawled nude around a campfire beside a 1952 bus "stuck in a deep ditch", that had been reported stolen in San Francisco on April 12. Manson was remanded into custody under the suspicion of grand theft auto and possession of two driver's licenses.

Scott, Atkins, Lake and Van Hall were charged with possessing fictitious and fraudulent driver's licenses. Pitman, Arneson and Bailey were jailed on charges of disorderly conduct and not possessing proper identification. Five other Family members were released without being charged. Brunner was booked on endangering the life and health of a child, after her one-week-old son, Valentine, was found by deputies improperly dressed and shivering. The baby was placed in the care of the Ventura County General Hospital.

Charges against Brunner were later reduced to contributing to the delinquency of a minor and she was given two years' probation and a 15-day suspended jail sentence. She subsequently told authorities she planned to return to her parents' home in Wisconsin and Valentine was returned to her.

Just a few months later, in June 1968, Brunner along with other members of the Manson Family were arrested in Mendocino County, California for supplying narcotics to minors.

== The Hinman murder ==
Family member Bobby Beausoleil left Spahn Ranch on July 25, 1969, accompanied by Brunner and Susan Atkins, to visit Gary Alan Hinman in Topanga Canyon. Hinman had been friendly with the Family and had often allowed members to stay at his home. Both Beausoleil and Brunner had previously lived with him for short periods of time and Brunner considered Hinman a close friend. Beausoleil had a knife and a 9-mm Radom pistol that he had borrowed from Family member Bruce Davis.

After two friends of Hinman contacted the police, Hinman was found murdered in his home by Malibu deputy Paul Piet on July 31, 1969. His face had been deeply slashed on the left side and he had two stab wounds in his chest. His house had been ransacked, and "Political Piggy" and a paw print (intended to be symbolic of the Black Panther Party) were drawn on the wall in his blood. His Volkswagen van and Fiat station wagon were missing. The California Highway Patrol found Beausoleil asleep in the back of Hinman's Fiat on August 5 near San Luis Obispo, California. He had a sheath knife attached to his belt. Beausoleil was arrested and charged with the murder of Gary Alan Hinman.

Brunner and Family member Sandra Good were arrested in San Fernando, California on August 8 at a Sears store for purchasing items with a stolen credit card. Brunner had signed for her purchases with the alias "Mary Vitasek" and the two women fled the store when a cashier became suspicious. The store manager followed them, and the police found them in possession of numerous stolen credit cards and fake identification cards. They were charged with violating Section 459 (burglary) and 484e (grand theft by fraudulent use of credit card) of the California Penal Code and booked into the Sybil Brand Institute Reception Center later that evening.

On the night of August 9, Family members Charles "Tex" Watson, Susan Atkins, Linda Kasabian, and Patricia Krenwinkel went to 10050 Cielo Drive and murdered pregnant actress Sharon Tate, her guests Wojciech Frykowski, Jay Sebring, and Abigail Folger, and 18-year-old Steven Parent, who was visiting William Garretson, who was house-sitting in the guesthouse normally occupied by Tate's landlord.

=== Prosecution witness ===
There is agreement that Manson was behind the killing of Hinman. Brunner was present throughout and was the key witness for the prosecution. She testified at Beausoleil's trial that Beausoleil killed Hinman (a musician), because Hinman had refused to join Manson's pop group.

=== Other hypotheses ===
There have been many other suggestions about the motive for the murder. Vincent Bugliosi, who was the prosecutor in the Tate-LaBianca case, claimed in his 1974 book Helter Skelter: The True Story of the Manson Murders, that Manson instructed Beausoleil, Brunner and Atkins to go to Hinman's house to get money and titles to Hinman's vehicles. This account was later corroborated by various Family members. However, Beausoleil denied Manson's direct involvement and maintained that neither Brunner nor Atkins had any direct knowledge of why he was visiting Hinman.

Beausoleil contended that he went to Hinman's home to confront Hinman and collect $1,000 for tabs of mescaline Beausoleil bought from Hinman and sold to a biker gang called the Straight Satans. He stated that several hours after the purchase, the gang showed up at Spahn Ranch claiming the mescaline was poisoned with strychnine. They demanded their money back and threatened to kill Beausoleil.

Beausoleil contended that both Brunner and Atkins went with him to Hinman's because they "liked" Hinman and wanted to visit. In a 1981 interview with Oui magazine, he stated that neither he nor Brunner nor Atkins were instructed by Manson to go to Hinman's and that he initially had no intention to kill him. This contradicts Beausoleil's testimony at his first trial in 1969 that Manson instructed him to kill Hinman. Beausoleil said "Mary Brunner was just scared to death. She just faded into the woodwork" during the murder, but Atkins went back into the house after Beausoleil stabbed Hinman and placed a pillow over Hinman's face. He also contended that it was Atkins who wrote the words "Political Piggy" on Hinman's wall (on Beausoleil's instruction).

In October 1969, police raided the Family's new residence at Barker Ranch near Death Valley, California, holding most of the group in custody on charges of automobile theft. Among those arrested were Atkins, who, while being questioned by police sergeants Whitley and Guenther on October 13, 1969, implicated herself in the murder of Hinman and told the officers that Manson had sent her and Beausoleil to Hinman's residence to force Hinman to hand over money that Manson believed Hinman had inherited. Atkins also told the police that Beausoleil alone acted in the murder of Hinman, stabbing him twice in the heart after detaining him in his home for over two days. Atkins also maintained that it was Beausoleil who slashed Hinman's face, not Manson. However, Atkins gave several differing accounts of the murder, at times claiming that she killed Hinman, Manson killed Hinman, or Beausoleil killed Hinman.

== Trial ==
Mary Brunner and Susan Atkins were subsequently charged along with Bobby Beausoleil for the murder of Gary Hinman. Brunner later received immunity from prosecution to testify against both Beausoleil and Atkins. His first trial, which began in November 1969, ended in a hung jury, with Beausoleil claiming that Manson alone had murdered Hinman.

However, during Beausoleil's March 1970 trial, Brunner recanted her testimony that Beausoleil murdered Hinman and Beausoleil produced an affidavit signed by Brunner stating that he did not stab Hinman. Called to the stand to testify, Brunner eventually repudiated her previous testimony and insisted that she said Beausoleil stabbed Hinman to death to absolve Charles Manson of participation in the crime. However, various former Family members, including Ella Jo Bailey, testified that Manson confessed to them that he was present at the Hinman house and participated in the murder.

Beausoleil was sentenced to death, later commuted to life (in accordance with the California v. Anderson decision). Atkins pleaded guilty for her participation in Hinman's death and was sentenced to life imprisonment. Bruce Davis was charged in the murder after it was revealed that Beausoleil had called Davis at Spahn Ranch and asked him to come over and pick up Hinman's Volkswagen van. Separate trials were held for the murders of Gary Hinman and Spahn Ranch worker Donald "Shorty" Shea, for Family members Davis, Charles Manson, and Steve "Clem" Grogan.

Brunner subsequently returned to the remaining members of the Family and rallied support for those incarcerated for the Tate–LaBianca murders. Her son was sent to live with her parents, who legally adopted him in 1976, changing his name to Michael Brunner.

== Hawthorne shootout ==
Brunner drove a white van to a Hawthorne, California Western Surplus Store on August 21, 1971, accompanied by Family members Catherine "Gypsy" Share, Dennis Rice, Charles Lovett, Larry Bailey, and Kenneth Como. The group brandished guns and ordered patrons and clerks to lie on the ground. They then took 143 rifles, loading them into their van, while a store clerk tripped the silent alarm. According to police officers, the group then debated whether to kill all of those in the store.

Police alleged that the group's plan was to hijack a Boeing 747 and threaten to kill one passenger every hour until Manson and fellow Family members were released from prison. A police squad car arrived, and Share opened fire on the vehicle, shattering the windshield. As more squad cars arrived, they blocked the van from fleeing, hitting it with more than 50 bullets; the Family members fired nearly 20 rounds at the officers. Police gained control and apprehended the group; Brunner, Share, and Bailey were injured.

Brunner received a sentence of 20 years to life. She was sent to the California Institution for Women where Leslie Van Houten, Susan Atkins, and Patricia Krenwinkel were serving their sentences for their participation in the Tate-LaBianca murders. Brunner disappeared from the public eye after being paroled in 1977.
