= Aquarius (American TV series) =

American television series (2015–2016)

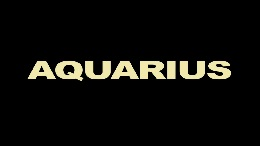
- Genre: Period drama; Crime drama
- Created by: John McNamara
- Starring: David Duchovny; Grey Damon; Gethin Anthony; Emma Dumont; Claire Holt; Michaela McManus; Brían F. O'Byrne; Chance Kelly; Ambyr Childers; Madisen Beaty; Cameron Deane Stewart
- Composer: W. G. Snuffy Walden
- Country of origin: United States
- Original language: English
- No. of seasons: 2
- No. of episodes: 26

Production
- Executive producers: Marty Adelstein; Vahan Moosekian; Becky Clements; Jonas Pate; Alexandra Cunningham; Sera Gamble; David Duchovny; Melanie Greene; John McNamara; Rafael Yglesias
- Producers: Desiree Cadena; Timothy A. Good; Nan Bernstein Freed
- Production location: Los Angeles, California
- Cinematography: Lukas Ettlin; Attila Szalay; Michael Stecher; David J. Frederick
- Editors: Timothy A. Good; Jennifer VanGoethem; Rich Fox; Brandon Lott
- Running time: 42–46 minutes
- Production companies: Tomorrow Studios; McNamara Moving Company; King Baby Productions; Fabrication (season 2)

Original release
- Network: NBC
- Release: May 28, 2015 – September 10, 2016

Aquarius is an American period crime drama television series created by John McNamara that aired on NBC from May 28, 2015, to September 10, 2016. Set in 1967 Los Angeles, the series explores the intersection of historical and fictional narratives, focusing on real-life figures and events while incorporating fictional characters and stories.

The show primarily follows LAPD Detective Sam Hodiak (played by David Duchovny), who investigates the rise of Charles Manson (Gethin Anthony) and the infamous Manson Family. The plot delves into themes of crime, counterculture, and social upheaval during the turbulent 1960s.

Aquarius received positive reviews from television critics, with praise for its period detail, storytelling, and David Duchovny's performance. It was among the eight series to receive the Critics' Choice Television Award for Most Exciting New Series in 2015.

Despite its initial success, Aquarius struggled with ratings, and was eventually cancelled by NBC on October 1, 2016, after two seasons.

== Overview ==
Aquarius is set in 1967 Los Angeles, blending real historical figures with fictional elements. The series follows LAPD detective Sam Hodiak, who is investigating the disappearance of Emma Karn, a teenage girl, with the help of his younger colleague, undercover officer Brian Shafe. Their investigation leads them to Charles Manson and his "family," a group of followers under Manson's control. The first season centers on Manson's growing influence, while the second focuses on the Tate murders and Manson's belief in an impending race war, which he called "helter skelter."

== Cast ==
=== Main cast ===
- David Duchovny as Sam Hodiak
- Grey Damon as Brian Shafe
- Gethin Anthony as Charles Manson
- Emma Dumont as Emma Karn
- Claire Holt as Charmain Tully
- Michaela McManus as Grace Karn
- Brían F. O'Byrne as Ken Karn
- Chance Kelly as Ed Cutler
- Ambyr Childers as Susan "Sadie" Atkins
- Madisen Beaty as Patty Krenwinkel — Beaty reprised this role in Quentin Tarantino's 2019 film Once Upon a Time in Hollywood.
- Cameron Deane Stewart as Tex Watson

=== Recurring cast ===
- Jason Ralph as Mike Vickery
- Beau Mirchoff as Rick Zondervan
- Tara Lynne Barr as Katie (season 1)
- David Meunier as Roy Kovic
- Shaun Duke as Art Gladner
- Gaius Charles as Bunchy Carter
- Jodi Harris as Opal Hodiak
- Milauna Jemai Jackson as Kristin Shafe
- Spencer Garrett as Hal Banyin
- Chris Sheffield as Walt Hodiak
- Brian Gattas as Rue Fisher
- Don Luce as Sal Dunphy
- Leah Bateman as Janet
- Clare Carey as Lucille Gladner
- Lobo Sebastian as Guapo
- Jade Tailor as Rachel
- Marshall Allman as Robbie Arthur
- Michael Drayer as Jimmy "Too" Butano
- Abby Miller as Mary "Mother Mary" Brunner
- Alex Quijano as Joe Moran
- James Martinez as Ruben Salazar
- Gabriel Chavarria as Juan
- Tim Griffin as Ron Kellaher
- Omar J. Dorsey as Ralph Church
- Alison Rood as Meg Frazetta
- Amanda Brooks as Sharon Tate
- Mark Famiglietti as Jay Sebring
- Johnny Kostrey as Wojciech Frykowski
- Andy Favreau as Dennis Wilson
- Calum Worthy as Steven Parent
- Jennifer Marsala as Abigail Folger
- Chase Coleman as Terry Melcher
- Mark L. Young as Bobby Beausoleil
- Jefferson White as Gary Hinman
- Olivia Taylor Dudley as Billie Gunderson

== Production ==
Series creator John McNamara described Aquarius as "historical fiction," blending real-life figures like Charles Manson with fictional characters and events to create a dramatized narrative set in 1967 Los Angeles. While inspired by Manson's infamous cult and the socio-political climate of the era, the show incorporates fictional storylines, historical events, and cultural references to highlight key social issues of the 1960s. NBC published a blog to provide historical context for the events portrayed in the series.

The soundtrack prominently features songs from the 1960s, with each episode named after iconic tracks from the era, including some associated with the Manson Family. Notably, Season 2 episode titles are all named after tracks from The Beatles' "White Album", reflecting Manson's obsession with their music (and that album in particular). The series is rated TV-14 for NBC broadcasts, though an unrated version with more explicit content was released on DVD.

Initially envisioned as a six-season show, Aquarius was renewed for a second season in June 2015, but it was ultimately canceled after two seasons.

== Episodes ==
Season	Episodes	Originally released	
Season	Episodes	First released	Last released
1	13	May 28, 2015	August 22, 2015
2	13	June 16, 2016	September 10, 2016

=== Season 1 (2015) ===
No. overall	No. in season	Title	Directed by	Written by	Original release date	US viewers (millions)
1	1	"Everybody's Been Burned"	Jonas Pate	John McNamara	May 28, 2015	5.67
Sixteen-year-old Emma Karn sneaks out of her Beverly Hills house to attend a party with her pseudo-boyfriend Rick Zondervan. There, they are separated by a group of girls, as instructed by another party-goer, Charles Manson, who tells Emma alone that she can survive in the world without her boyfriend or father. The next day, Emma's mother Grace calls her former boyfriend LAPD Hollywood division detective Sam Hodiak: Emma used to sneak out with Rick, who claims she then left with someone else. At Manson's commune, he plays music for his followers, and Katie tells Emma that he wants to become more famous than The Beatles. At a diner on the Sunset Strip, undercover Detective Brian Shafe meets Mike Vickery. A drug deal is made, and Brian tells Mike that he is after the diner owner, Art Gladner. Outside the police are getting rough with a hippie group out past the 10 p.m. curfew. Brian intervenes and gets arrested. Back at the station, Sam recruits Brian to help find Emma. Rick gives them the first name of the guy Emma left with, Charlie. Brian enlists Detective Charmain Tully, who could pass as a young female hippie, to help him infiltrate the Manson Family, but they first need biker Roy Kovic to lead them to Charlie. Manson's history is revealed: he had been working as pimp and one of his prostitutes (Caroline Beecher) disappeared; he then was in jail for drug possession on a reduced sentence and Emma's father Ken was Charlie's lawyer. Charlie demands Ken introduce him to an executive in the music business, then attempts to rape him and cuts him with a razor.
2	2	"The Hunter Gets Captured by the Game"	Jonas Pate	John McNamara	May 28, 2015	5.67
Sam questions Ken about his connection to Charlie, and Grace points him to Manson's file. Ken admits to having been Charlie's lawyer and that Emma is with Manson. Brian learns that Rick is telling everyone he is a cop; he asks for Sam's help to shut him up. Before they can, they receive a call about a white woman, Joyce Nankin, being killed at her home in a now-black neighborhood in South Central. Their investigation focuses on Bunchy Carter, leader of the Black Panthers, who accuses the police not having solved any of the 27 black murders in the neighborhood. Bunchy is arrested for interference, but it was really to dupe Joyce's husband into confessing to her murder. Sam and Brian get Rick to confess he told Art that Brian was a cop. They offer Art a deal for reporting his partners but he refuses, and Sam writes the word "snitch" on Art's forehead. To test Emma's loyalty, Charlie asks her to shoplift. When she gets caught, Charlie murders the owner. Sam's soldier son Walt shows up at his house, claiming a "new policy" as to why he is not fighting in the Vietnam War, while in reality Walt's mother Opal had arranged a letter about a sick parent. Charlie demands a thousand dollars (and another thousand upon Emma's release) from Ken for a music demo tape. When Ken visits Charlie to hand over the money, Charlie kisses Ken, asking him if he remembers what it was like to be free. Emma nearly interrupts them, and Ken is terrified of being caught.
3	3	"Never Say Never to Always"	Nelson McCormick	Alexandra Cunningham	June 4, 2015	3.90
Later that night, Sam enters his ex-wife Opal's house to find out about Walt and is caught by Sam's former partner Ed who is now Opal's lover (thereby cheating on his wife Jean). Opal reveals Sam's past domestic abuse. Meanwhile, at Manson's commune, Ken had sex with Charlie, picking up their previous relationship. Ken is confused and afraid and is seen leaving in his car by a shocked Emma. The next day, Art is found stabbed inside his locked diner and Ed arrests Mike as suspect. Roy finally leads Brian and Charmain to the Manson Family commune 'Spiral Staircase' near Topanga where both are introduced to Charlie. Brian informs Sam about Emma's location, but when Sam and Grace get there, Charlie and a group of girls including Emma (who he calls 'Cherry') had left to record his demo. Military police are looking for Walt. Later that night, Charlie, whom Roy had warned earlier about Sam's search of the commune, takes Emma and Sadie to the recording engineer Rue Fisher's house to barter him with "sharing" the girls; then Charlie calls to intimidate the Karns with a recording featuring Emma.
4	4	"Home Is Where You're Happy"	Michael Zinberg	Sera Gamble	June 11, 2015	3.74
The same night, Grace reports Manson's phone call to Sam, who returns to the commune, but Charlie had left Emma and Sadie at Rue's house. In the morning, Sam follows Manson and observes him picking up the girls, but misses seeing that Charlie murders Rue. Sam is looking for Walt who is hiding at a friend's place. To help Brian get Mike released, Sam investigates Art's murder through his widow Lucille Gladner who runs the burlesque club, the Peach Pussycat. Eventually, Sam finds and arrests Art's true murderer, a crooked deliveryman who had overheard the snitch discussion between Art and Sam (Ep. 2). Pressured by Ed to deliver results, Brian makes Mike visit Guapo, his alibi for the time of Art's murder and an important member of the drug ring. Mike is supposed to get information about Guapo's associates but Guapo already knows that the real murderer has been arrested. Brian's home in a white neighborhood in the Valley, where he lives with his wife Kristin in a mixed-race marriage, becomes the target of racist vandalism. Ken gets drunk and has anonymous gay sex at a public restroom. He later comes to the commune upset, intending to kill Manson with a rifle, but Charlie talks him out of it and sends Ken away. Ken then tells Grace he saw Emma at the commune. Manson uses LSD to brainwash his girls. Grace and Sam pick up an intoxicated Emma to take her home.
5	5	"A Change Is Gonna Come"	Michael Zinberg	Rafael Yglesias	June 18, 2015	3.33
Sam and Grace resume their sexual relationship. Ed is promoted to acting Lieutenant. Sam investigates an arson-murder case at a hair salon in South Central, but is impeded by a group of Black Panther members led by Bunchy, who demand the investigation of an arrest-related strangling of a black teenager by a racist white cop. Manson unsuccessfully tries to threaten Ken's partner Hal Banyin to get access to Emma. At a fundraiser for Richard Nixon with Ronald Reagan, Sam and Grace are caught kissing by Hal and Ken. Pretending to be a classmate, Susan Atkins comes to visit Emma at the Karns' house, and they both disappear, despite Emma being guarded by a retired cop that Sam had hired. At the Peach Pussycat, Brian meets mobster Jimmy "Too" Butano Jr., whose father was Manson's cellmate. Sam solves the arson-murder case, which turns out to be not racially motivated. Brian's friend Robbie Arthur found out Walt has joined the anti-war movement. At night, Walt appears at Sam's house, explaining he witnessed the war being fought in Cambodia with illegal means, and saying he is going to hand over proof to the press. Finding out that Atkins helped Emma run away, a drunk Sam beats up Charlie severely. Manson is only saved by Brian, who had brought Jimmy to the commune to conduct business with Charlie, and Brian further gains Manson's trust.
6	6	"A Whiter Shade of Pale"	Michael Offer	David Reed	June 25, 2015	3.15
The next morning, Grace demands Ken explain his previous business as Manson's lawyer, and accuses him of having dragged Emma into it. Ken explains that Manson has incriminating information about him, Hal, and the RNC. She learns from Sam that in 1959, Ken represented Manson in the case of the missing prostitute Caroline Beecher; the case was dropped, but remains unsolved. Grace asks her mother if they can withdraw their investment from Ken's law firm. After another attack on Brian and Kristin's house, Sam promises to investigate while Brian is working undercover. He traces the vandalism back to their landlord, who has a scheme to lower the real estate value of white neighborhoods by introducing mixed-race tenants, then buying out the white neighbors cheap and reselling the houses to new non-white owners with a huge markup. Charmain investigates the case of a battered cheerleader, the girlfriend of a well-known and abusive USC football player. Robbie tells Sam that Walt has gone hiding from the MPs. Sam returns to drinking heavily, and sleeps with Opal. As Charlie slowly recovers from his beating, Jimmy and Brian pay a visit. Jimmy presents a pistol as a surprise gift, which causes a fight with Roy. After the misunderstanding is cleared, Charlie accepts the gun, then thanks Brian and Jimmy by giving them two girls to have sex with. Brian and Janet agree to just pretend.
7	7	"Cease to Resist"	Michael Waxman	Sera Gamble	July 2, 2015	2.44
Intending to go after Sam, Manson arrives at Opal's house with his new gun. He is caught by Ed, introduces himself as 'Jesus Christ', and escapes after a fight. Ed finds Sam's watch on the bedroom floor where he had lost it the previous night. The next morning, Sam is called to the robbery-murder of actor Raymond Novo whose body appears to have been crucified that night on the Paramount Pictures lot. It is discovered that Novo regularly brought men there to date, which was covered up by the studio. Reluctantly, Brian gathers information undercover at a gay bar, but eventually the investigation is closed down due to pressure from the studio to keep Novo's homosexuality secret. Sadie and Emma drive to San Francisco to see 'Mother' Mary, who had taken care of Manson and his first followers during the Summer of Love after he was released from prison. They find that Mary is pregnant, and tell her Charlie's orders to come to Los Angeles and bring her stock bonds. Manson is discussing an expensive weapons deal with Roy. Mary arrives and reveals she had cut ties with Charlie after being beaten by him (as seen in the prequel).
8	8	"Sick City"	Jon Amiel	Alexandra Cunningham & Mike Sheehan	July 9, 2015	2.47
Sam investigates about a pastor stealing donation money to gamble at poker games. Ken gets nominated as California campaign finance chair for Richard Nixon, which will cause the RNC to run background checks on Ken, his family, and the law firm. Hal has found out about Sam's investigation on the Caroline Beecher case. Ken visits Emma at the commune and suggests to legally emancipate her so her behavior cannot be brought back to him as her father. Record producer Elliot Hillman visits the commune, but Charlie fails to make a good impression. Angry, he orders the girls to take a double dose of LSD, but Emma secretly disobeys and leaves. At the Peach Pussycat, Mike has caught Lucille's eye and they engage in a sadomasochistic sexual relationship. Jimmy and Roy negotiate a deal with the 'Satans' biker club. With Lucille's help, Roy kills Jimmy. Sam tries to find Louise Mitchell, the prostitute who had reported Caroline missing in 1959. He meets his old friend 'Nurse' Martha Kendall, a prostitute herself, who knew Louise (under a different name), until she had suddenly left town. Ken digs out Caroline's remains in the desert.
9	9	"Why?"	Jonas Pate	John McNamara & Mike Sheehan	July 18, 2015	1.18
Sam, Ed, and Brian decide against arresting Lucille and Roy for Jimmy's murder in favor of Brian and Mike's covert investigations against Guapo. Brian tries to stay in business with Lucille and Roy, but they are sceptical and tell him he needs Guapo's approval. Ken reports to Charlie that all evidence has been taken care of. They sleep together and Ken asks Charlie to stay hidden because of the campaign. Emma is still gone. At a Big Boy coffee shop in Watts, two policemen are shot, witnessed by a shocked Charmain. Sam convinces Bunchy to cooperate in the investigations to prevent SWAT teams from moving into the black neighborhood. Later, two more policemen fall victim to the same white assassin. Sam and Brian locate Glenn Lesick, the owner of the car that was used by the assassin. Because there is not enough other evidence against Lesick, Sam asks Charmain to give false testimony to have him arrested.
10	10	"It's Alright Ma. (I'm Only Bleeding.)"	John Dahl	Rafael Yglesias	July 25, 2015	1.16
Sam is tripping on LSD, almost interrupting a party for Ronald Reagan at Grace's house. Emma returns to the commune with Rick. When Charlie finds out Rick's father is rich, they steal his credit card. Charlie demands that Emma pledge her loyalty, and Emma asks him about her father's secret. Brian and Mike come to the commune to discuss a drug delivery with Roy and Guapo. To prevent Rick from blowing Brian's cover again, he is sworn in as undercover deputy. Ed has been pressuring Brian to deliver results on the drug ring but Brian aborts the bust of the deal in the last minute. It turns out that the deal was just a setup to test Brian who has now earned Guapo and his cousin Juan's trust. To appease protesters against the police because of an unsolved series of bus robberies on Chicano women in Echo Park, Los Angeles Times journalist Ruben Salazar wants to improve public opinion with an article on Cuban detective José Morán/Joe Moran. However, Moran objects as he had made everyone believe he was Irish. When his secret is revealed, Moran is kicked out by his white Catholic wife and mocked by his colleagues, causing an identity crisis. Sam talks him out of committing suicide. Manson takes Emma along on a burglary. On observation photos of antiwar activists around Robbie Arthur, Sam recognizes his father whom he has arrested and brought in to the station to question.
11	11	"Your Mother Should Know"	Roxann Dawson	David Reed	August 1, 2015	1.18
At Sam's house, his father, his son Walt, and Opal are discussing how to proceed to avoid a trial for treason. Sam suggests to return the classified orders, or to hand them to the press. He later asks Salazar who refuses to publish the intel anonymously. The FBI orders a closer surveillance of the Black Panthers. Bunchy asks Sam to investigate the murder of his brother and bodyguard Arthur. Sam finds an FBI informant had shot Arthur because he was discovered. Guapo is preparing a big delivery of heroin. Juan steals some of it to buy out his girlfriend from her pimp. To protect Juan, Brian pretends having killed the thief and returns the missing drugs. As Manson plans on having his son born at the commune, Emma, Sadie and Rick break into a house in Beverly Hills to steal baby supplies. After an argument with Emma, Sadie calls the police and leaves; Rick and Emma are arrested for burglary. Sam refuses to bail Emma out of custody to teach her a lesson. Brian learns that Chris Wagner whom he had met in the gay bar (Ep. 7) was murdered. Charmain has located Louise Mitchell in Riverside. Sam urges Charmain to work on her false testimony instead. Manson's estranged mother Kathleen arrives at the commune to discuss an inheritance from Charlie's grandfather. A bitter Manson refuses to reconcile with her, drugs her with LSD and has her raped by the bikers, in return for a cheaper price on the weapons deal.
12	12	"(Please Let Me Love You and) It Won't Be Wrong"	Lukas Ettlin	Alexandra Cunningham & Sera Gamble	August 8, 2015	1.25
Hillman returns to the commune to produce a documentary. They learn that Charlie's followers see him as Jesus Christ. Charlie is suspicious about Sadie not having brought back Emma, and after she admits being jealous, he beats her but is caught on film, so Charlie throws the film crew out. In return for reduced charges on her marijuana possession, burlesque dancer Rachel offers her testimony against Roy whom she saw loading Jimmy's body into a hearse. Brian concludes that the formaldehyde smell of Guapo's bag comes from a funeral home. Rachel hides at Sam's house and eventually returns to Lucille, with Sam pretending to be her boyfriend as alibi for the days she had missed work. Sam urges Charmain again to work on her false testimony. Brian is looking for a connection between the murders of Raymond Novo and Chris Wagner. They question judge Murray whose wife was murdered by a man Murray had picked up and brought home. Sam seeks legal help for his AWOL son from Ken, in return for dropping the investigation on Louise Mitchell. Conflicted about the deal, Sam gets drunk, leading to tensions with Brian. A sobbing Hal arrives at Ken's house wearing a blood-stained shirt and saying, "It happened again."
13	13	"Old Ego Is a Too Much Thing"	Jonas Pate	Story by : John McNamara; Teleplay by : Rafael Yglesias & David Reed	August 22, 2015	1.13
Hal explains to Ken that Manson has been providing him with girls for sadistic abuse, usually Sadie, but she was unavailable. Janet, the substitute, died from Hal's abuse. Ken and Hal go back to the apartment where Hal killed Janet and left her body, only to discover Charlie there. Charlie has already removed Janet's body and will keep as leverage against Hal. Flashbacks show how Charlie had called for Ken to dispose of Caroline's body in 1959 after Hal had killed her. When she turns out not to be dead yet, Ken has to kill her. Grace and Sam finally have Emma released and she returns to the commune. Mary goes into labor but the child is stillborn. Sadie steals an infant from a hospital, introducing him to the commune as Charlie's son. Sam negotiates a deal for Walt with the DOD, but Walt chooses to go public through Salazar and gets arrested by MP. Brian locates the suspect in the homosexual robbery-murder series; the arrest starts a fight during which Sam kills the two brothers. To the commissioner, Sam says the shooting death of one brother was necessary to save himself and Brian, but admits that the death of the second brother was unnecessary. The commissioner wants to close the file and avoid a trial to protect the reputation of Novo and Murray, so instead of disciplining Sam, he decides to give him a medal of valor. However, during the medal ceremony, an internal affairs agent whispers to Sam that there was a witness. Ken drugs Hal, intending to fake his suicide, but Hal wakes up, they struggle over the gun and shots are fired. Charmain finds the funeral home used by the drug ring but is recognized there by Roy and goes missing.

=== Season 2 (2016) ===
Season 2 debuted on June 16, 2016, with a two-hour, commercial-free event that constituted the first three episodes.

No. overall	No. in season	Title	Directed by	Written by	Original release date	US viewers (millions)
14	1	"Helter Skelter"	Jonas Pate	John McNamara	June 16, 2016	2.99
On August 9, 1969 at 4:22 am in a residence, Emma and Charlie are shown in a crime scene to the shock of Emma, but Charlie calms her down and both leave. Sixteen months earlier, Sam Hodiak finds himself drawn into a new case when he begins receiving mysterious packages with photos of missing girls. Hal escapes from Ken's car and attempts to run by rolling down the cliff onto a road, which leads to him passing out; as Ken tries to shoot him, a couple who notices Hal on the road arrives. Charmain is questioned over her motives by Roy at a bar. Charlie is visited by Ralph Church, a former cellmate who forces Charlie to let him and his group a stay at the commune. Grace informs Ken that Hal is in the hospital and dying, much to Ken's joy, but when Ken gets to the hospital, he is informed by Grace that Hal will end up living. Charmain's risky undercover operation leads to her finding valuable information for a drug case, but exposes her to great danger; Sam arrives and finds her living with Roy after she gathered information from a biker in Roy's gang; Sam and Brian Shafe find Guapo's dead body in a boiler room. On August 9, 1969, at 4:24 am in a residence, Charlie comments to Emma that he believes a race war is coming, which he calls 'Helter Skelter'.
15	2	"Happiness Is a Warm Gun"	Jonas Pate	John McNamara	June 16, 2016	2.70
On August 9, 1969 at 12:22 a.m., a man is shown having a conversation with a heavily pregnant woman named Sharon over her husband's arrival from traveling as Sadie is seen to approach them. Sixteen months earlier, Ralph returns to the commune with a group of men and they are confronted by the family and other followers but bribes them for his stay at the commune when Charlie sees him holding his infant son. Sam and the rest of the precinct question possible suspects over the murders of Guapo and a group of other men. Hal awakes from his coma. Sam and Grace continue their relationship, then Ken is questioned by Grace's father over what happened to Hal and his desire to keep his partnership afloat due to running for senator. Meanwhile, behind a grocery store, Charlie and the family come up with plan to get rid of Ralph and meet a woman named Patty. Ken pays Hal a visit at the hospital and attempts to persuade him to lie over what happened. Charmain continues her undercover work around Roy. Sam pays a visit to Lucille Gladner in relation to Guapo's murder, she then asks for protection and reveals potential information leading to another suspect in Roy's drug supplier, a man named Wells. Patty convinces Emma to go with her to see Beach Boys member Dennis Wilson, to arrange a meeting for Charlie with him. Sam and Opal pay a visit to Walt, with Sam trying to get leverage for his son. Charlie and the family reveal they've poisoned Ralph and his group in a meal. On August 9, 1969 at 12:23 a.m., Sadie is shown taunting the tied-up man and woman in a bedroom, and calls Patty to bring more rope.
16	3	"Why Don't We Do it in the Road"	Timothy Busfield	Alexandra Cunningham	June 16, 2016	2.41
On August 9, 1969 at 12:22 a.m., a young man is shown departing from a residence; while at its gate, he is greeted by Tex Watson and Sadie as Tex shoots the young man several times and both walk away. Sixteen months earlier, on his way to meet Dennis, Charlie meets an ex-football player named Charles Watson, to whom Charlie takes a likening and nicknames him 'Tex' due to his accent. Sam continues to receive mysterious packages with photos of missing girls over murder cases. Charlie finally meets Dennis as both then bond over their common interest in music. Sam and Grace tread on familiar territory in regards to their relationship. Brian takes a shot at a killer case and gets rewarded in reluctance for his sharp work. On August 9, 1969 at 12:21 a.m. at the residence, a man is shown waking up on a sofa and being greeted by Tex, and the man is kicked in the face as both engage in a struggle.
17	4	"Revolution 1"	Timothy Busfield	Rafael Yglesias	June 23, 2016	1.73
On August 10, 1969 at 12:12 a.m., Brian is shown in the living room at a crime scene and is then shown injecting himself with a drug substance. Sixteen months earlier, on the day of Martin Luther King, Jr.'s assassination, Brian informs Charmain of Lucille Gladner's murder and immediately starts to question Roy, but Charmain doubts it was him; Charlie and the family continue their stay at Dennis's house; Sam must investigate a murder in a black neighborhood while trying to prevent an imminent riot; while he also finds out that Walt is in solitary confinement and is being charged in his case. In the midst of the crisis in the black community, Kristin's involvement with the Black Panthers drives a wedge between her and Brian. Charmain and Brian investigate Roy's drug dealer, Watts; saying he doesn't trust a drug mule who won't sample the product, Watts convinces Brian to inject himself with a drug substance; later, Charmain brings the drug case to a close and discovers the full cost of undercover work, after a struggle ends with Roy being shot; a memorial parade is held for King, with Manson and Dennis shown to be in the parade. On August 10, 1969 at 12:17 a.m., Brian calls Sam from a residence and informs him that he is in trouble.
18	5	"Everybody's Got Something to Hide Except Me and my Monkey"	James L. Conway	David Reed	June 30, 2016	1.88
On August 9, 1969 at 12:27 a.m., a young man hears a scream of a woman outside of a residence as she is being murdered by Tex; in fear, the young man decides to turn up the music in the guest house; Tex then orders Emma to check the guest house and kill anybody who is inside. Sixteen months earlier, Dennis raves about Emma's singing talent, which ignites jealousy in Charlie. Dennis takes Emma and Charlie to meet a record producer who lives at the residence. Meanwhile, Brian recovers from the previous night's drug use and makes up with wife Kristin, while at work he receives a promotion; Charmain takes up a social issue affair case involving a radical group on a college campus; Sam visits his son Walt in prison and deals with internal affairs at the precinct, but tragedy interrupts the investigation as Sam finds out that Opal committed suicide. On August 9, 1969, in the same time frame, Emma is shown to walk in at the guest house finding the young man.
19	6	"Revolution 9"	Jonas Pate	Rafael Yglesias	July 7, 2016	1.74
On August 9, 1969 at 8:06 a.m., a black maid (Inger Tudor) is shown arriving at a residence however she sees the word 'Pig' in blood mysteriously written on a door at the residence. Sixteen months earlier, the maid is shown to be a server at Terry Melcher's party where Charlie (who makes a racial comment to the maid but the maid just walks away), the girls (Emma, Sadie, Patty), and Dennis continue their stay at the party, however Charlie starts to get impatient due to lack of interaction with Melcher and another record producer in attendance. Sam and Brian continue with their missing girls' murder case, in which more evidence is unraveled. Ken amasses information in relation to Bobby Kennedy (Scott Bailey) and Grace finds a new interest in politics. At Melcher's party, Melcher is shown in sexual intercourse with one of the Manson girls when Charlie interrupts and tries to assure Melcher will agree to a recording deal. Sam helps an old war buddy find his blackmailer, but the buddy ropes Sam into a deal to be a guard for Kennedy, who is running for the democratic presidential nomination against Eugene McCarthy; Sam guards Kennedy at a campaign stop but Kennedy is fatally shot by a man (Toofun West). When Brian gets mysteriously "sick", Kristin discovers a needle syringe in a couch at their house, revealing Brian's developing drug addiction. Charlie's persistent behavior leads to him singing a song; Dennis loves the song and recommends Charlie sing it at another party of Melchers', however when arriving, all three are greeted by the other record producer who informs Dennis that Melcher is not there, his presence is "everywhere"; the producer then makes a remark in reference to the campaign about Charlie about not hanging with "losers". On August 9, 1969 at 8:07 a.m., the black maid runs out of the residence in horror over what was discovered.
20	7	"Piggies"	Jon Amiel	Sera Gamble & Mike Moore	July 14, 2016	1.79
On August 9, 1969 at 12:38 a.m., Sadie is seen at a residence marking a disturbing symbol at the main door of the residence; the following day at 12:17 a.m., Sam is seen to receive a call then leaving. Twelve months earlier, Sam and Brian continue to solve the missing girls' murder case. Charmain continues her social issue affair case involving a radical group at the local college campus. Charlie and the family continue their stay at Dennis' house, however when Dennis gets a medical bill, Sadie finds out that she is pregnant; Sadie and Tex are shown in an isolated location when attempting a drug deal and Tex ponders if the child is his; the drug dealer is revealed to be a surprisingly alive Ralph Church, who recognizes and attacks Sadie causing she and Tex to flee; the potential threat of Ralph leads to Charlie persuading Emma to get Sam to help them. The Karns continue their part in politics. A shootout between the Black Panthers and LAPD reverberates in Brian and Kristin's marriage; Kristin confronts Brian about the drug paraphernalia she found. Sam puts a story in the newspaper to attempt to get the missing girls' murderer to react, and later receives a call from the killer; Sam thinks he recognizes the voice. On August 9, 1969 at 12:44 a.m., the Manson family are shown leaving a residence with blood splatter on all involved, leaving a trail of bodies behind.
21	8	"While My Guitar Gently Weeps"	Nelson McCormick	Alexandra Cunningham	August 27, 2016	2.10
On August 10, 1969 at 12:17 a.m., Brian recounts a crime scene. 12 months earlier, Brian awakens yet again 'sick' while Sam continues his missing girls murder case and is then confronted by Charlie who is looking for a missing Emma; Sam is then found unexpectedly by Charlie at his home who both inadvertently bond including Charlie who recounts his relationships and children. Ken Karn goes to new levels for his political international diplomacy. Brian officially confesses his drug addiction to his wife, Kristen. Sam calls Ken Karn asking for Emma's whereabouts much to no help then at the precinct, Sam receives a call from Dennis over Charlie. On August 10, 1969 at 12:18 a.m., Brian is haunted by his demons through surrounding crime scene.
22	9	"Sexy Sadie"	David Boyd	John McNamara	August 27, 2016	1.60
On August 9, 1969 at 12:42 a.m, Sadie is seen taking a few infant items inside a residence. 12 months earlier, Charlie finds out from studio producers over the changes of his song used by Dennis; he then avoided by Dennis but it is shown that Dennis no longer lives in his house. Sam advises Brian to check into a drug rehab. Sam informs Grace that he has found Emma at a psychiatric institution, however she expresses her own faults as a parent. Kristen informs Sam that Bunchy Carter was arrested for assault. Grace's father informs Ken that he is cut from his political campaign; an angered Ken confronts Hal at his house who reveals to him that he gossiped his secrets to various sources, he also finds the Manson family there also. At the precinct, Charmain opens a mysterious letter in a shower. Emma is released from the institution. Bunchy Carter is released then hosts a Black Panthers meeting only for a shootout to commence by a pair of assailants as Bunchy is shot and Kristen is shown to run. Sometime in 1969, Charlie arrives at Terry Melcher's house only to be informed by a photographer and one of the new residents that he no longer lives there. Charlie develops anger that alludes to what would be murders of a group of people.
23	10	"Blackbird"	Michael Zinberg	Rafael Yglesias	September 3, 2016	1.22
On August 8, 1969 at 10:12 p.m., Charlie convinces Tex to take the family over enacting a plan which it is shown that the family is at a residence tying up a helpless man and woman. Seven months earlier, Emma is back at home with the Karns however she misses Charlie. Sam and Brian are called to what was a Black Panthers meeting to investigate Bunchy Carter's murder; Sam later on ponders who murdered Bunchy to even questioning Charmain who is still going undercover in a radical rights group; Sam finds the mysterious assailants with the help of Kristen. A frantic Charlie continues to look for Dennis even forcing himself in at his house but does not find him, however he leaves a subliminal message with the house keeper; Charlie along with Tex continues his search including at a bar who bumps himself into Ralph but both end up arrested. Brian continues his drug rehab sessions. Sadie and Patty meet a man named Bobby at Hal's house who is physical distress; Patty and Bobby then buy a drug from a man named Gary Hinman; Hal mentions to the family about a movie ranch named Spahn Ranch. Roy is revealed to be alive. Ken discloses to Emma over where he might find Charlie while Charlie and Ralph are released from jail, however outside the jail, the family murders Ralph. Sam's suspects over Bunchy's murder are somehow released by the F.B.I, Charlie and the family move into Spahn Ranch who are then found by Emma and Ken as all rejoice, recent events officially separate Brian and Kristen. On August 8, 1969 at 10:13 p.m., Ken is shown begging Charlie and the rest of the family to not take Emma on enacting a plan then the family along with Emma are shown entering a residence.
24	11	"Can You Take Me Back?"	Timothy A. Good	David Reed	September 3, 2016	1.18
On August 9, 1969 at 12:26 a.m., a horrified Emma is shown outside a residence looking upon the Manson family who are torturing a tied up helpless man and woman as Tex is shown to shooting the man in his head. Three months earlier, the Manson family are officially settled in at Spahn Ranch; Mary Brunner returns and arrives at the ranch informing Charlie that the police have taken their son after attempting to gather supplies; Emma accompanies Mary to Gary's to change her appearance as a way to look presentable as a mother, however she tells Emma that she will be moving back to her parents’ house, Brian convinces Kristen to return home, however he relapses by consuming drug substances with a friend; a scare leads to Brian bumping himself into a vengeful Roy at his house who tries to get revenge on Charmain for events transpired leading to her stabbing Roy in defense, and Sam gets into trouble again with the Internal Affairs department, which changes his position in the precinct including being suspended. Things are looking up for Charlie and the family when Terry Melcher returns to record Charlie's music; Mary re-gains her son back and decides to stay with the family, Emma reveals to Ken that she is pregnant, then Terry changes his mind and starts to insult Charlie over his experience as a musician and that he and Dennis would no longer associate with him anymore. The Karns officially separate; Sam officially quits the force; a guilt ridden Brian is shown sitting alone in a chair of his living room at his house and repo men are shown taking away items. On August 9, 1969 at 12:32 a.m., a shocked Emma is shown at a residence spectating the Manson family's actions to what they left in surrounding, then she sees the rest of the family members gathering around a helpless pregnant woman laying on the living room floor begging for the life of her unborn baby until screams of her being stabbed are heard by Emma who weeps.
25	12	"Mother Nature's Son"	David Duchovny	Sera Gamble	September 10, 2016	1.32
On August 9, 1969, at 12:32 a.m., Sam is seen confronting and assaulting a man (implied to be the serial killer from his missing girls case) at his house and holds him at gunpoint. 14 days earlier, Charlie convinces Sadie, Bobby, and Mary to get money from Gary who he believes that will help them on the run; The three hold him hostage until Charlie shows up with a sword who slashes an ear. After that, Mary tries to free Gary before she is caught and forced to play a tune on his piano, then Bobby stabs Gary, ostensibly on Charlie's instruction. Before departing, Bobby uses Gary's blood to write "Political piggy" on the wall and draws a panther paw, a Black Panther symbol; the next day Bobby is arrested after being found in Gary's car. Sam starts a relationship with Billie, the drug therapist then visits Walt who informs him that he is released and convinces him to stay with him. Brian continues his relapse, shooting a perpetrator accidentally. He is then punished by Ed, who makes him do desk work. Sam gets another call from the serial killer of his missing girls case. Charmain convinces the female member of the radical rights group to help her on the case. Ken continues to go to extreme lengths to continue his career in politics. Sam is shown being taunted by a man who is implied to be the serial killer of his missing girls case, he is persuaded by Brian to not shoot him.
26	13	"I Will"	Jonas Pate	John McNamara & Mike Moore	September 10, 2016	1.22
On August 7, 1969 at 3:42 a.m., Sam concludes his missing girls case who he finds out the identity of the killer to be a man named Gerald Dunn, a former convict. Ken returns to Spahn Ranch and convinces Charlie that he will now on take care of him, he then spooked when he finds Emma and some of the Manson girls cleaning weapons as he is explained by Charlie that it is part of 'Helter Skelter'. The next day at 9:18 a.m., Sam convinces Brian to arrest Dunn, as he finds out that he is the perpetrator of the missing girls case, but he is released due to lack of substantial evidence. At the ranch, Ken overhears Charlie on informing the rest of the family on enacting a plan, and begs him on not taking Emma with them. At 12:15 a.m., Tex and the rest of the family are seen outside a residence and he proclaims that they will leave a mark after tonight. The family eventually enters the residence and brutally murders and mutilates a group of people that includes three men and two women (one who was pregnant); Emma was also told to murder the caretaker, a young man who lived in the guest house but she spares him when she tells him to avoid having himself found. Sam finds Billie dead at her house. Back at the ranch, Charlie talks with Ken over his theory of a race war. Ken is choked and killed by Charlie. The family returns to the ranch only to be scolded by Charlie when he feels the actions caused was not enough, before he and Emma return to the residence; around 4:22–4:24 a.m., Charlie comments to Emma about 'Helter Skelter' before departing at 5:19 a.m. Sam finally arrests and confronts the serial killer at his house, he finds his next victim who is locked in the trunk of his car; Sam discovers Billie is alive and the woman found earlier was her sister. At the precinct, Sam says his goodbyes but the precinct receives alarming call before Ed persuades Sam to return immediately. 16 hours later, the murder scene at a residence is identified to be at 10050 Cielo Drive including the finding of the housemaid, Winifred Chapman of those of the casualties involved. At 12:12 a.m., Brian investigates the crime scene and injects himself with a drug substance until calling Sam and informs him that he is in trouble. Sam immediately leaves the precinct.

=== Webisodes ===
The Summer of Love is a series of four short webisodes. They are set in San Francisco in 1967 during the Summer of Love, before the events of season 1, where Charlie gathers his first followers Mary, Katie, and Sadie.

No.	Title
1	"Meet Charlie"
Manson Girls Mary Brunner and Katie recall how both initially met Charlie at the local college.
2	"Sweet Sadie"
Manson Girl Sadie recalls meeting Charlie due to being enchanted with his singing voice. Then both bond in Mary's apartment, where Sadie is introduced to Mary when arriving back. Later on in the night, all three sleep with each other, leading to Mary developing trust issues with Charlie.
3	"Charlie vs. Martin"
The Manson girls recall when Charlie bumped into Mary's neighbor Martin (who was a fellow student) and Katie outside Mary's apartment. Charlie attempts to engage in a conversation with Martin over being an aspiring musician, however Martin ignores him. Later on in the night, the girls recall hearing Martin being assaulted next door.
4	"Heading to LA"
Mary questions Charlie's intentions and expresses her trust issues, then insults him over his music talent and goals in life. This leads to Charlie slapping her and leaving her crying on her kitchen floor. He and Sadie leave for Los Angeles.

== Broadcast ==
Aquarius premiered on NBC on May 28, 2015. After the broadcast, NBC made all 13 episodes of the first season available for a four-week period on its website, mobile app, and Hulu, while continuing to air episodes weekly in the regular television slot.

In Australia, the series debuted the following day, May 29, 2015, on the streaming platform Presto, releasing all episodes for 28 days. The show later premiered on television via the Seven Network on August 26, 2015. The second season was similarly aired on Presto simultaneously with its U.S. release.

== Reception ==
=== Critical response ===
Season 1 of Aquarius received mixed or average reviews, with a Metacritic score of 58/100, based on 36 critic reviews. Glenn Garvin of Reason praised the series for going beyond the typical retelling of the Charles Manson story, highlighting its portrayal of the 1960s' epic social battles around race, gender, drugs, and the Vietnam War. He also commended the show for its "killer 1960s soundtrack."

=== Ratings ===
These Nielsen ratings reflect the regular TV broadcast, but do not include the online binge-watching that was made possible by releasing the complete series on demand even before the TV broadcast. Those online view numbers, however, are not publicly available. NBC claims they helped gaining insight into online viewing behavior.

==== Overall ====
Viewership and ratings per season of Aquarius
Season	Timeslot (ET)	Episodes	First aired		Last aired		TV season	Avg. viewers (millions)
Season	Timeslot (ET)	Episodes	Date	Viewers (millions)	Date	Viewers (millions)	TV season	Avg. viewers (millions)
1	Thursday 9:00 p.m. (1, 3–8); Thursday 10:00 p.m. (2); Saturday 9:00 p.m. (9–13)	13	May 28, 2015	5.67	August 22, 2015	1.13	2014–15	TBD
2	Thursday 9:00 p.m. (1); Thursday 10:00 p.m. (2–7); Saturday 9:00 p.m. (8, 10, 12); Saturday 10:00 p.m. (9, 11, 13)	13	June 16, 2016	2.99	September 10, 2016	1.22	2015–16	TBD

==== Season 1 ====
Viewership and ratings per episode of Aquarius
No.	Title	Air date	Rating/share (18–49)	Viewers (millions)
1	"Everybody's Been Burned"	May 28, 2015	1.1/4	5.67
2	"The Hunter Gets Captured by the Game"	May 28, 2015	1.1/4	5.67
3	"Never Say Never to Always"	June 4, 2015	0.7/2	3.90
4	"Home Is Where You're Happy"	June 11, 2015	0.8/3	3.74
5	"A Change Is Gonna Come"	June 18, 2015	0.7/3	3.33
6	"A Whiter Shade of Pale"	June 25, 2015	0.6/2	3.15
7	"Cease to Resist"	July 2, 2015	0.4/2	2.44
8	"Sick City"	July 9, 2015	0.5/2	2.47
9	"Why?"	July 18, 2015	0.2/1	1.18
10	"It's Alright Ma. (I'm Only Bleeding.)"	July 25, 2015	0.2/1	1.16
11	"Your Mother Should Know"	August 1, 2015	0.2/1	1.18
12	"(Please Let Me Love You and) It Won't Be Wrong"	August 8, 2015	0.3/1	1.25
13	"Old Ego Is a Too Much Thing"	August 22, 2015	0.2/1	1.13

==== Season 2 ====
Viewership and ratings per episode of Aquarius
No.	Title	Air date	Rating/share (18–49)	Viewers (millions)
1	"Helter Skelter"	June 16, 2016	0.5	2.989
2	"Happiness Is a Warm Gun"	June 16, 2016	0.4	2.701
3	"Why Don't We Do it in the Road"	June 16, 2016	0.4	2.414
4	"Revolution 1"	June 23, 2016	0.4	1.727
5	"Everybody's Got Something to Hide Except Me and my Monkey"	June 30, 2016	0.4	1.882
6	"Revolution 9"	July 7, 2016	0.4	1.736
7	"Piggies"	July 14, 2016	0.4	1.794
8	"While My Guitar Gently Weeps"	August 27, 2016	0.4	2.10
9	"Sexy Sadie"	August 27, 2016	0.3	1.60
10	"Blackbird"	September 3, 2016	0.2	1.22
11	"Can You Take Me Back?"	September 3, 2016	0.2	1.18
12	"Mother Nature's Son"	September 10, 2016	0.3	1.32
13	"I Will"	September 10, 2016	0.2	1.22

== Awards ==
Aquarius was among the eight series to win the Most Exciting New Series at the 5th Critics' Choice Television Awards in 2015.
