= House of Manson =

- Film poster
- Directed by: Brandon Slagle
- Written by: Brandon Slagle
- Produced by: Devanny Pinn, Britt Griffith
- Starring: Ryan Kiser
- Cinematography: Michael Rattet
- Edited by: Maximillian Williams
- Production companies: House of Manson; Micro Bay Features
- Distributed by: Kaleidoscope; Lighthouse Digital Media; New Horizon Films; Gravitas Ventures; Hulu
- Release date: October 18, 2014 (Twin Cities Film Festival)
- Running time: 98 minutes
- Country: United States
- Language: English

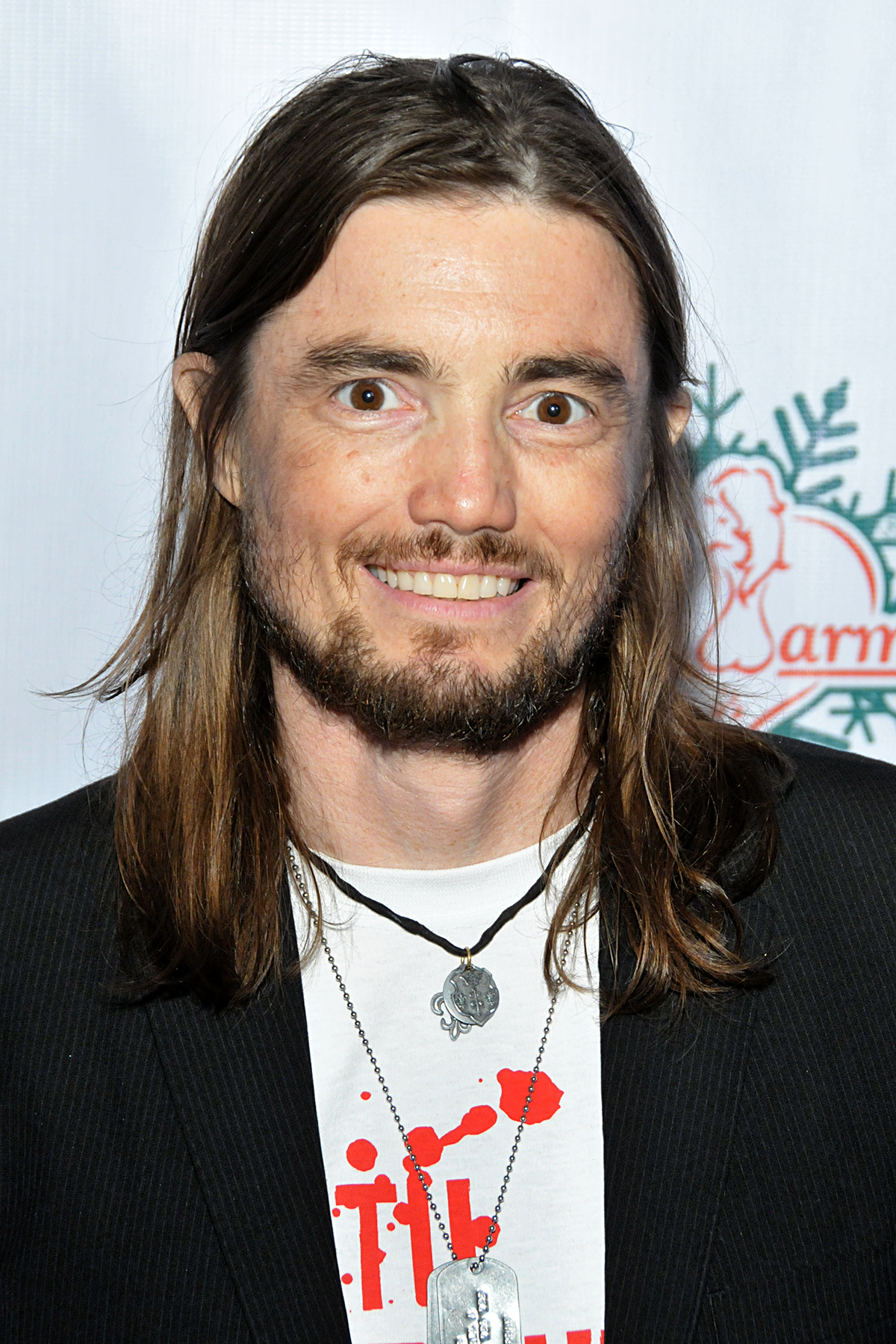
Ryan Kiser, Hollywood, California on December 11, 2014

House of Manson (also known as Manson in the United Kingdom) is a 2014 biographical film that was written and directed by Brandon Slagle. It had its world premiere on October 18, 2014 at the Twin Cities Film Festival and stars Ryan Kiser as Charles Manson.

== Plot ==
The film begins by tracing the childhood and early life of Charles Manson during the 1940s and 1950s. It depicts his unstable upbringing by a distant mother, early delinquent acts, and his frequent clashes with authority. Throughout his adolescence and early adulthood, Manson cycles through juvenile detention facilities and federal prisons for crimes ranging from auto theft to check forgery. During these years in prison, he learns to play guitar, studies esoteric philosophy, and learns techniques of manipulation and pimping.

Upon his release from McNeil Island Penitentiary in 1967, Manson moves to San Francisco during the height of the "Summer of Love." He encounters young, vulnerable runaways and societal dropouts who are drawn to his charismatic persona, musical ambitions, and counterculture ideology. Manson gradually forms a tight-knit commune—later known as the "Manson Family"—composed largely of young women, including Mary Brunner and Susan Atkins.

Manson relocates the group to Spahn Ranch, an isolated, aging movie ranch in Los Angeles County owned by George Spahn. There, he establishes total psychological control over his followers through group isolation, intense psychedelic drug trips, sexual manipulation, and constant indoctrination. Manson attempts to break into the music industry, forming connections with figures like Beach Boys drummer Dennis Wilson and record producer Terry Melcher. However, after Melcher declines to sign him to a recording contract, Manson grows increasingly bitter and paranoid.

Fusing his interpretation of the Beatles' White Album with Biblical prophecy, Manson formulates an apocalyptic theory he calls "Helter Skelter." He preaches to his followers that an imminent, violent race war will destroy civilization, leaving the Family to emerge from an underground sanctuary in the desert to take control of society. When the predicted war fails to materialize on its own, Manson decides the Family must instruct society on how to start it by executing a series of horrific murders and framing Black militant groups.

On the night of August 8, 1969, Manson orders Tex Watson, Susan Atkins, Patricia Krenwinkel, and Linda Kasabian to travel to 10050 Cielo Drive—the former residence of Terry Melcher, now rented by director Roman Polanski and his pregnant wife, actress Sharon Tate. The group brutally murders visitor Steven Parent outside before entering the house and slaughtering Tate, Jay Sebring, Abigail Folger, and Wojciech Frykowski, leaving bloody messages scrawled on the walls.

Unsatisfied with the disorganization of the first night's violent attack, Manson personally accompanies the group the following evening, August 9. They select the Los Feliz home of supermarket executive Leno LaBianca and his wife Rosemary. Manson enters the house, ties up the couple, and orders his followers to execute them while he departs in their vehicle.

Following the murders, the Family flees Los Angeles and settles at the secluded Barker Ranch in Death Valley. Law enforcement agencies, initially treating the murder scenes as drug-related or isolated home invasions, connect the crimes after Atkins boasts about Tate's murder while incarcerated on an unrelated charge. A joint law enforcement raid on Barker Ranch leads to the arrest of Manson and his core inner circle. The film concludes by illustrating the chaotic high-profile trial, during which Manson's followers carve X's into their foreheads in solidarity, Kasabian provides crucial testimony for the prosecution, and the defendants are convicted and sentenced to death (later commuted to life imprisonment).

== Cast ==
- Ryan Kiser as Charlie
- Devanny Pinn as Susan Atkins
- Julie Rose as Leslie Van Houten
- Reid Warner as Tex Watson
- Serena Lorien as Patricia Krenwinkel
- Tristan Risk as Abigail Folger
- Max Wasa as Rosemary LaBianca
- Suzi Lorraine as Sharon Tate
- Tawny Amber Young as Rosalie Willis
- Erin Marie Hogan as Linda Kasabian
- Caitlin Kazepis as Gypsy Share
- Jennifer Woods as Terry's Girlfriend
- Trish Cook as Kathleen Maddox
- Brandon Slagle as Uncle Maddox
- Dillon Paigen as Steven Parent
- Teresa R. Parker as Officer Orr (as Teresa Parker)

== Reception ==
Dread Central gave House of Manson a favorable review, writing that it was "informative, violent, shocking, and saddening – Slagle should be applauded for taking on a subject that’s been beaten to death and giving it a totally new perspective from the audience’s point of view." Shock Till You Drop also gave a positive review, citing its acting and praising it for being "one of the few true-crime biopic indie films to roll out in a long time that doesn’t feel like simply an excuse to make a film, cashing in on the name". Starburst was mildly more mixed, stating that it "won't offer any new insights or conclusions but it does present a different slant on a character whose infamy shows no sign of abating. Slagle's film is of interest though, built on excellent performances and subtle, almost documentary-like direction that draws the viewer in."
