= Bruce M. Davis =

American criminal (1942–2026)

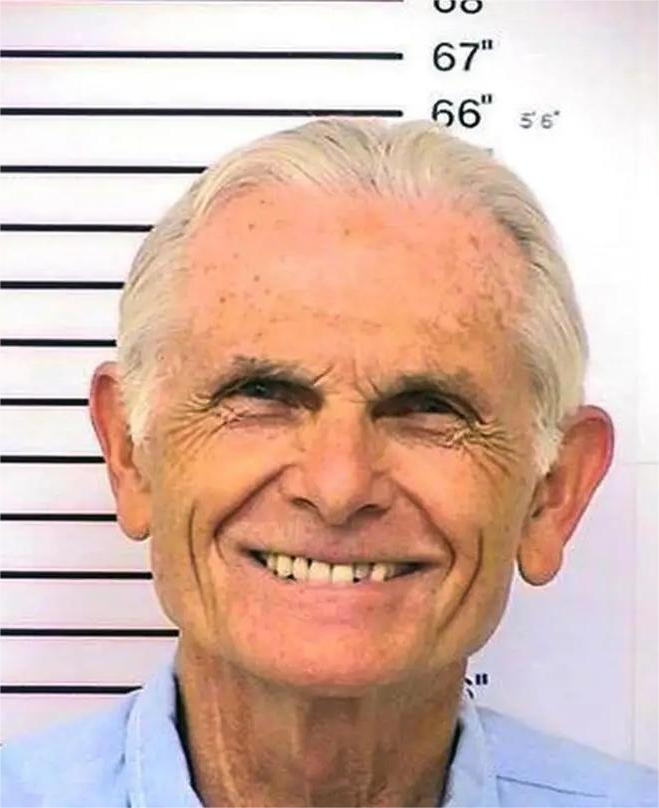
- 2014 mug shot of Bruce M. Davis
- Born: October 5, 1942; Monroe, Louisiana, U.S.
- Died: September 11, 2026 (aged 83); California Medical Facility, Vacaville, California, U.S.
- Allegiance: Manson Family
- Convictions: First degree murder Conspiracy to commit murder Robbery
- Penalty: Life imprisonment with the possibility of parole

Details
- Date: August 26, 1969
- Killed: 1 (Donald Shea)

Bruce McGregor Davis (October 5, 1942 – September 11, 2026) was an American criminal and member of the Manson Family who has been described as Charles Manson's "right-hand man".

== Early life ==
Bruce McGregor Davis was born on October 5, 1942, in Monroe, Louisiana, and grew up in Mobile, Alabama.

Davis attended Roane County High School in Kingston, Tennessee, where he was editor of his high school yearbook, and attended the University of Tennessee for three years, dropping out due to poor grades. In 1962, he hitchhiked to California, where he worked for a time as a barback at Harrah's Lake Tahoe. Davis stated that he regularly consumed cannabis and LSD, hitchhiked and lived as a drifter. In Ed Sanders's book The Family, the author claims that Davis met Charles Manson and his associates Mary Brunner, Lynette Fromme, and Patricia Krenwinkel in Oregon in 1967, but Davis himself said in a February 2023 interview that he met Manson in Topanga in 1968, shortly after having been arrested in front of a Malibu, California liquor store for drug possession. Davis stated that when they first met, Manson was in a bathtub outdoors, being bathed by around five girls, and that Davis primarily joined the family because of the girls and drugs.

He traveled to Europe and spent time traveling in Spain, Portugal, and Morocco, and claimed he was introduced to Scientology after arriving in London in November 1968 when he was invited by girls he met after stepping out of the Earl's Court underground station. He said he first heard about Scientology from Manson, but that he did not think Manson was very knowledgeable about it. This conflicts with Manson's claim that he was "Theta Clear", the highest level within Scientology. Davis lived in London from November 1968 to April 1969 while working at the Church of Scientology headquarters. Manson picked him up from LAX on his return, and that was when Davis first noticed Manson's change in ideology as he embraced Helter Skelter.

== Manson Family murders ==
Davis was present when, in July 1969, Manson cut Gary Hinman's left ear. Hinman was stabbed to death by Bobby Beausoleil, although neither Manson nor Davis was present when Hinman was murdered. In late August, Davis did participate in the murder of Spahn's Ranch hand Donald "Shorty" Shea.

He said that he was at Spahn Ranch on August 8, 1969, the night of the Tate murders. He said that Susan Atkins approached him, saying that they were going out that night and that Manson wanted him to come, but that he refused. Davis said the same thing occurred the following night, the night of the LaBianca murders.

Davis was present when, on November 5, 1969, John Philip Haught a.k.a. "Zero", allegedly killed himself playing Russian roulette. Davis claimed in an April 2023 interview that he was in the front room of the house, and heard a popping from the back room. He thought they were setting off firecrackers, until "Patty" (Madeline Cottage) came in and told him Zero shot himself. He stated that the gun was a "Sears Roebuck High Standard .22 automatic", a semi-automatic firearm that cannot be used to play Russian roulette. Manson prosecutor Vincent Bugliosi wrote in Helter Skelter that the gun police found was a .22 caliber Iver Johnson revolver. Davis also stated that he had put his finger on the muzzle of the firearm after the shooting, and that the police found his fingerprints, while Bugliosi wrote that the police did not find any fingerprints on the pistol.

At some point after these events, Davis went into hiding, ultimately turning himself in on December 2, 1970.

== Conviction and prison ==
External audio
- Bruce Davis BBC Interview with Bill Scanlon-Murphy

In 1972, Davis was convicted in Los Angeles County of two counts of first-degree murder for the killings of Hinman and Shea, conspiracy to commit murder, and robbery. California having recently abolished the death penalty, he was sentenced to life imprisonment. He began his sentence on April 21, 1972. He became a preacher in the prison chapel and had kept a clean disciplinary record since 1980. He was found suitable for parole in 2010, 2012, 2014, 2015, 2017, 2019, and 2021. In each case, the sitting Governor reversed the decision. In July 2022, the two-member panel board denied him parole. His lawyer said that the panel highlighted Davis's "lack of empathy". He was imprisoned at California Medical Facility when he died on September 11, 2026, at the age of 83.
