= Clem Grogan =

American convicted murderer

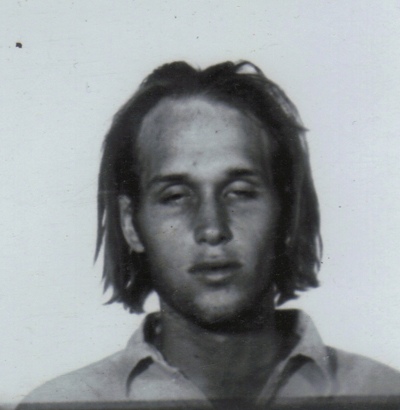
- Grogan in 1969
- Born: Steven Dennis Grogan; July 13, 1951 (age 75); Los Angeles, California, U.S.
- Other names: Clem Tufts, Grant Mollan, Scramblehead, Adam Gabriel
- Occupations: Musician, artist
- Children: 1
- Status: Paroled
- Conviction: First degree murder
- Penalty: Death; commuted to life imprisonment

Details
- Killed: 1 (Donald Shea)

Steven Dennis "Clem" Grogan (born July 13, 1951) is an American convicted murderer and former member of the Manson Family. He was released from prison in 1985.

== Biography ==
Grogan, a musician and artist, dropped out of high school and was involved in minor crimes. He moved to Spahn Ranch and joined the Manson Family in the spring of 1968. He was often considered dumb, or even mentally disabled, by other Family members, earning him the nickname "Scramblehead", but some felt he was only "playing dumb". Allegedly, it was Grogan who wrecked Dennis Wilson's uninsured Ferrari. In 1969, he was sentenced to 90 days observation at Camarillo State Mental Hospital for exposing his penis to a group of school children, but he returned to the ranch after two days.

On the night of August 10, 1969, he rode with members of the Manson family. Charles Watson, Patricia Krenwinkel and Leslie Van Houten were dropped off at the house of Leno and Rosemary LaBianca, but Grogan, Manson, Susan Atkins and Linda Kasabian continued to Venice Beach where, according to Kasabian, Manson sent Grogan, Atkins and Kasabian to kill actor Saladin Nader, but Kasabian, according to her own account, intentionally led them to the wrong apartment and the plan was aborted.

Grogan later helped Manson, Watson and Bruce M. Davis kill Spahn ranch hand Donald Shea. The jury returned verdicts of life imprisonment for Manson and Davis, but death for Grogan. However, on December 23, 1971, Judge James Kolts stated that "Grogan was too stupid and too hopped on drugs to decide anything on his own" and that it was really Manson "who decided who lived or died" and reduced Grogan's sentence to life imprisonment.

Grogan later assisted the authorities and drew a map to where Shea's body was buried. In prison he was head of the prison's program to deter juveniles from a life of crime and kept away from fellow inmate Manson. Grogan was released on parole from prison in 1985.

Grogan played guitar and sang in the Freedom Orchestra Band with fellow Manson family conspirator Bobby Beausoleil when they both served time at the Deuel Vocational Institution in Tracy, California. Beausoleil later revealed that he convinced Grogan to begin the guitar, even making one. After release from prison, Grogan studied guitar at Musicians Institute in Hollywood, graduating in 1987.

As of 2025, Grogan and Van Houten are the only people who have been released from prison after being convicted of murder in the killings committed by the Manson Family, with Van Houten being released 38 years after Grogan.

== In media ==
Grogan was one of the people featured in the Oscar-nominated 1973 documentary film Manson.

Grogan is portrayed by James Landry Hébert in the 2019 film Once Upon a Time in Hollywood.
