= Donald Shea =

American stuntman and actor murdered by the Manson Family (1933-1969)

- Born: Donald Jerome Shea; September 18, 1933; Medford, Massachusetts, U.S.
- Died: August 26, 1969 (aged 35); Chatsworth, California, U.S
- Cause of death: Murder by stabbing
- Other name: Shorty
- Occupations: Actor; Stuntman; Ranch hand
- Spouse: Magdalene Velma Jones (m. 1969)
- Children: 2

Donald "Shorty" Jerome Shea (September 18, 1933 – August 26, 1969) was an American stuntman and actor who was murdered in 1969. The location of his body was discovered in 1977, eight years after his death. Manson Family cult leader Charles Manson and disciples Clem Grogan and Bruce M. Davis were eventually convicted of murdering Shea. Additionally, Tex Watson was considered to be a possible participant in the murder, but was never charged.

== Life ==
Donald Jerome Shea was born in Medford, Massachusetts on September 18, 1933. According to Shea's autopsy report, he served in the United States Air Force (s/n AF 11 270 704) from December 1954 until June 1956. He stood approximately 6 feet 4 inches (1.93 m) tall.

Shea moved to California to pursue a career in acting, mostly finding work as a stuntman. Later, he worked as a bouncer and as a ranch hand at Spahn Ranch, an old Hollywood movie set that had become a horse-riding stable. His autopsy report identifies him as "foreman" of the ranch. Shea reportedly got along with the other ranch employees.

When the Manson family moved to Spahn Ranch, Shea initially co-existed with them peacefully. In time, however, Charles Manson began to look down on Shea because he had married a black woman by the name of Magdalene. Manson hated and mistrusted black people, and had been disgusted when Magdalene’s friends showed up at the ranch. Magdalene stayed at the ranch for only a few weeks before leaving Shea and returning to Las Vegas. According to Shea's autopsy report, Magdalene eventually settled in Lexington, Kentucky.

Eventually, Shea planned to help George Spahn remove the Family from the Spahn Ranch when the Family's brushes with the law grew out of control.

== Motives for Shea's murder ==
Manson decided to have Shea killed because he believed Shea had reported the Family and their crimes to the police, resulting in a raid on the ranch on August 16 where the family were taken into custody on suspicion of car theft. Family member Bruce Davis claimed that the decision to kill Shea came from Manson because he considered him to be a "snitch".

Another motive for the murder could have stemmed from a fight between Charles Manson and Shea at the Gresham Street home in Canoga Park, Los Angeles, that Manson shared with Bill Vance and several Manson Family Members. Windy Bucklee, the wife of Spahn Ranch ranch hand Randy Starr, was beaten by Charles Manson for her refusal to loan her truck to Manson and Vance for robberies. In the days prior, law enforcement questioned Bucklee for a string of robberies in which her truck had been identified. She realized that Manson and Vance had been borrowing her truck to commit these robberies and decided to quit loaning it to them. When Shea found out about Manson assaulting Bucklee, he went to the Gresham Street home and assaulted both Manson and Vance with threats to stay away from Spahn Ranch.

After Manson moved into Spahn Ranch, Larry Bailey, one of the newer members of the Manson Family, was spying on Shea for Manson and was quickly caught. As a result, Shea, Bucklee, and others stripped Bailey naked and tied him to a tree facing the main road to send a message to the others.

== Murder ==
Shea was murdered on August 26, 1969, more than two weeks after the Tate–LaBianca murders.

One account states that Susan Atkins of the Family lured Shea to a remote spot on the ranch; there he was ambushed and killed by Bruce M. Davis and Steve "Clem" Grogan.

Bruce Davis testified that Manson told him, Tex Watson, and Steve Grogan to ask Shea for a ride to a nearby car parts yard on the ranch. According to Davis, he sat in the back seat with Grogan, who then hit Shea with a pipe wrench and Watson stabbed him. They brought Shea down a hill behind the ranch and stabbed and brutally tortured him to death. Bruce Davis recalled at his parole hearings:

I was in the car when Steve Grogan hit Shorty with the pipe wrench. Charles Watson stabbed him. I was in the backseat with... with Grogan. They took Shorty out. They had to go down the hill to a place. I stayed in the car for quite a while but what... then I went down the hill later on and that's when I cut Shorty on the shoulder with the knife, after he was... well, I don't know... I... I don't know if he was dead or not. He didn't bleed when I cut him on the shoulder.

When I showed up, you know, he was... he was incapacitated. I don't know if... you asked if he was unconscious, I don't know. He may or may not have been. He didn't seem conscious. He wasn't moving or saying anything. And it started off Manson handed me a machete as if I was supposed to... I mean I know what he wanted. But you know I couldn't do that. And I... in fact, I did touch Shorty Shea with a machete on the back of his neck, didn't break the skin. I mean I just couldn't do it. And then I threw the knife... and he handed me a bayonet and it... I just reached over and... I don't know which side it was on but I cut him right about here on the shoulder just with the tip of the blade. Sort of like saying "Are you satisfied, Charlie?"

And I turned around and walked away. And I... I was sick for about two or three days. I mean I couldn't even think about what I... what I had done.

According to Bruce Davis and Steve "Clem" Grogan, who participated in Shea's murder, Bill Vance and Larry Bailey also were present at the killing.

== Cover-up and admission ==
In a grand jury testimony, Family member Barbara Hoyt recounted hearing the screams which terrified her so much that she left, deciding to escape the family, frightened that she might be next. As Hoyt describes,

"It was around ten at night. I heard a scream and got up.... I thought, 'Maybe I imagined that.' I lay back down, and the screams started again, and they kept happening and happening and happening. It was Shorty. I recognized his voice. I was scared. I crouched in a ball on the floor. The next day I heard Charlie talking about it. He said, 'Shorty died with a little help from us. He was hard to kill, but we brought him to Now.'"

According to the Los Angeles Times, "a witness testified that Manson boasted he had cut Shea up into nine pieces and buried him under some leaves."

Hoyt's testimony of the approximate time of Shea's murder contradicts the official stories given by participants Davis and Grogan at their parole hearings. Windy Bucklee agreed that Shea was not the type of person who would scream and beg, and would have gone to his death fighting.

On December 9, 1969, Shea's 1962 Mercury was found with a footlocker of his possessions and a pair of bloodstained cowboy boots belonging to him. A palm print of Davis was found on the footlocker.

Despite the lack of Shea's body as evidence, in 1972 Manson and Family members Grogan and Davis were convicted of murdering him.

== Remains located and burial ==
In December 1977 Shea's skeletal remains were discovered on a nondescript hillside near Santa Susana Road next to Spahn Ranch after Grogan, one of those convicted of the murder, agreed to aid authorities in the recovery of Shea's body by drawing a map to its location. According to the autopsy report, his body suffered multiple stab and chopping wounds to the chest, and blunt force trauma to the head.

Sgt. Bill Gleason, LASO Homicide; Deputy Coroner John Mossberger; and Deputy Sheriff Barry Jones, LASO Homicide, were on the site when Shea was exhumed in 1977. Gleason had been the officer who obtained the Spahn Ranch Raid search warrant in August 1969. Shea was 35 years old when he was murdered.

Shea is buried in a community plot in Angeles Abbey Memorial Park in Los Angeles, California.

== See also ==
- List of solved missing person cases: 1950–1999
