= Susan Atkins =

Convicted murderer and member of the "Manson family" (1948–2009)

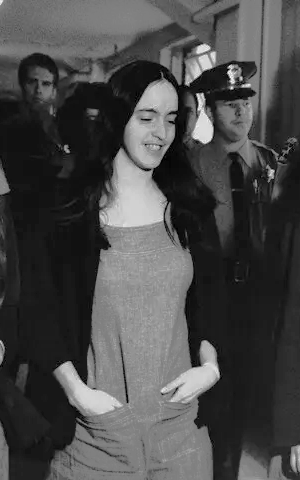
- Atkins in 1971
- Born: Susan Denise Atkins; May 7, 1948; San Gabriel, California, U.S.
- Died: September 24, 2009 (aged 61); Chowchilla, California, U.S.
- Other names: Sadie; Sadie Glutz; Sadie Mae Glutz
- Spouses: Donald Lee Laisure (m. 1981; div. 1982); James Whitehouse (m. 1987)
- Children: 1
- Convictions: First degree murder Conspiracy to commit murder
- Penalty: Death; commuted to life imprisonment

Details
- Date: August 9–10, 1969
- Killed: 8 (including an unborn child)

Susan Denise Atkins (May 7, 1948 – September 24, 2009) was an American convicted murderer who was a member of Charles Manson's "Family". Manson's followers committed a series of nine murders at four locations in California over a period of five weeks in the summer of 1969. Known within the Manson family as Sadie, Sadie Glutz, Sadie Mae Glutz or Sexy Sadie, Atkins was convicted for her participation in eight of these killings, including the most notorious, the Tate murders in 1969. She was sentenced to death, which was subsequently commuted to life imprisonment when the California Supreme Court invalidated all death sentences issued prior to 1972. Atkins was incarcerated until her death in 2009. At the time of her death, she was California's longest-serving female inmate, since surpassed by fellow Manson family members Leslie Van Houten and Patricia Krenwinkel.

== Early life ==
Atkins was born on May 7, 1948, in San Gabriel, California. She was of English, Irish, Scottish, and German descent. The second of three children, she grew up in northern California. According to Atkins, her parents, Jeanne (née Jett) and Edward John Atkins, were alcoholics. Her mother died of cancer in 1964. Over the next three years, Susan's life was disrupted by the gradual breakup of her family, frequent relocations, and her leaving home to live independently. Until she was 13 years old, Atkins and her family lived in a middle class home in the Cambrian Park area of San Jose, California. She was described by those who knew her as a quiet, self-conscious girl who belonged to her school's glee club and the local church choir. Two weeks before her mother was hospitalized for the final time, Susan arranged for members of the church choir to sing Christmas carols under her bedroom window. After Jeanne Atkins's death, relatives were asked to help look after Susan and her two brothers.

Edward Atkins eventually moved to Los Banos, California, with Susan and her younger brother Steven. When he found work on the San Luis Dam construction project, Edward left the two children behind to fend for themselves. Susan took a job during her junior year in school to support herself and Steven. Atkins had been an average student in Leigh High School in San Jose, but her grades deteriorated when she entered Los Banos High School. During this time, she lived with various relatives.

In December 1966, Atkins asked two classmates to go to San Francisco with her over the Christmas school break. In early 1967 she was working as a stripper in Los Angeles, and Anton LaVey hired her for a performance. Later in 1967, Atkins met Manson when he played guitar at the house where she was living with several friends. When the house was raided several weeks later by the police and Atkins was left homeless, Manson invited her to join his group, who were embarking on a summer road trip in a converted school bus painted completely black. She was nicknamed "Sadie Mae Glutz" by Manson and a man who was creating a fake ID for her at the time. Atkins later claimed to have believed Manson was Jesus. The growing "Manson Family" settled at the Spahn Ranch in the San Fernando Valley in southern California, where, on October 7, 1968, Atkins bore a son by Bruce White, whom Manson called Zezozose Zadfrack Glutz. Atkins's parental rights were terminated once she was convicted of the murders, and no one in her family would assume responsibility for the child. Her son was adopted and renamed from the time of her incarceration in 1969. She had no further contact with him.

== Murder of Gary Hinman ==
During the summer of 1969, Manson and his commune at Spahn's Ranch were attracting the attention of the police, who suspected them of auto thefts and were suspicious of the high number of underage runaways. In an attempt to raise money to move away to the desert, Manson encouraged drug dealing. Purportedly, a botched drug scam by Family member Charles "Tex" Watson led Manson to confront and shoot a man named Bernard "Lotsapoppa" Crowe. Manson believed he had killed Crowe, and he further believed Crowe was a Black Panther. Neither was true. Nonetheless, Manson feared retaliation from the Black Panthers and pressured his followers for more money.

During this time someone suggested that Family acquaintance Gary Hinman had just inherited a large sum of money. Manson hoped Hinman could be persuaded to join the commune and contribute his purported new inheritance.

Manson sent Atkins, Bobby Beausoleil, and Mary Brunner to Hinman's home on July 25, 1969. When Hinman said that he had not inherited any money, Beausoleil beat him severely. When Hinman still insisted that he had no inheritance, Manson showed up in person and swung at his head with a sword, slicing his face and severely cutting his ear. Manson directed Atkins and Brunner to stay behind and tend to Hinman's wounds. Two days later, and after a phone call from Manson, Beausoleil had Hinman sign over the registrations to his cars and then fatally stabbed him twice. Beausoleil left a bloody hand print on the wall along with the words "Political Piggy" reportedly placed there in hopes of implicating the Black Panthers. Beausoleil was arrested on August 7, 1969, when he was found asleep in one of Hinman's vehicles. He was still wearing the bloodstained clothing he wore during the crime. The murder weapon was hidden in the tire well of the car's trunk.

== Sharon Tate and LaBianca murders ==
On the evening of August 8, 1969, Manson gathered Atkins, Linda Kasabian, and Patricia Krenwinkel in front of Spahn's Ranch and told them to go with Charles "Tex" Watson and do as they were told. In Atkins's grand jury testimony, she stated that while in the car, Watson told the group they were going to a home to get money from the people who lived there and to kill them.

On the night of August 10, 1969, Manson, Atkins, Krenwinkel, Watson, Linda Kasabian, Leslie Van Houten, and Steve "Clem" Grogan, went to the home of Leno and Rosemary LaBianca. Manson and Watson entered the home and tied the couple up. He then went back to the car and sent Krenwinkel and Van Houten inside to do as Watson said.

Atkins wrote "PIG" on the front door in Sharon Tate's blood.

== Motivation ==
In later years, prosecutor Vincent Bugliosi stated that he believed the murders had numerous, disparate motives, all of which he believed served to benefit Manson. Atkins stated that she wanted to commit a crime that would shock the world.

== Arrest and jailhouse confession ==
On August 16, 1969, the police raided Spahn's Ranch in connection with auto thefts. The charges were later dropped and everyone was released. Soon after their release, Manson and his followers left Spahn Ranch for Barker Ranch, another isolated location. However, the authorities were still suspicious of the group, raided the new location in October 1969, and arrested the group again on auto theft and arson charges. It would be the last time many of them would be free. Just after this arrest, another member of the group implicated Atkins in the Hinman murder and she was charged with that crime.

While in jail, Atkins befriended two middle-aged career criminals, Virginia Graham and Veronica "Ronnie" Howard, to whom she confessed her participation in the Tate/LaBianca murders (for example, telling the women that she had stabbed Tate and tasted Tate's blood). They subsequently reported her statements to the authorities. This, combined with information from other sources, led to the arrests of Atkins and others involved in the Tate/LaBianca murders (Van Houten, Krenwinkel, Kasabian, and Watson).

Virginia Graham and Ronnie Howard later received the bulk of the $25,000 reward offered by Roman Polanski for solving the murder case.

== Grand jury testimony ==
Atkins agreed to testify for the prosecution, in exchange for the State of California not seeking the death penalty against her. Atkins appeared before a grand jury, and provided extensive testimony concerning the events on the nights of August 8 and 9, 1969.

When asked if she were willing to testify, knowing that she was not being given immunity, and might incriminate herself in her trial testimony, she responded, "I understand this, and my life doesn't mean that much to me. I just want to see what is taken care of."

Atkins's grand jury testimony was extremely lurid, and provided remarkable details concerning the Tate murders. Atkins told the grand jury that she stabbed Frykowski in the legs and held Tate down while Watson stabbed her. She also testified that Tate had pleaded for her life and that of her unborn child. In response, Atkins replied, "Woman, I have no mercy for you." She told the grand jury that her words were intended to reassure herself, and not addressed to Tate. Atkins also denied her earlier statement to Howard and Graham that she had tasted Tate's blood.

Prior to the trial, Atkins repudiated her grand jury testimony in a written statement filed with the court, and discontinued her cooperation with the prosecution. As a result, the State of California sought the death penalty in her case.

Atkins alleged that the reason that she repudiated her grand jury testimony was that "Manson sent his followers to suggest that it might be better for me and my son if I decided not to testify against him".

There is an ongoing debate as to the exact details of the killings and the accuracy of Atkins's grand jury testimony. In the book Helter Skelter, Vincent Bugliosi (the prosecutor) wrote that he viewed Atkins's testimony as "substantially truthful," with a few omissions concerning the events of the second night.

However, Atkins herself later gave a slightly different account of the crimes. In a 1976 interview, after she had become a born-again Christian, Atkins claimed that she did not actually stab anyone during the Tate murders, and that Watson was responsible for the murder of Sharon Tate. In his 1978 memoir, Watson declared himself responsible for all of Tate's injuries, characterizing Atkins's initial confessions as exaggeration, jail house bragging, and a bid for attention.

From the early 1970s onward however, Atkins had told parole boards that her original grand jury testimony was truthful and accurate as to what transpired in the Tate home; however, it didn't completely match the forensics and autopsy reports.

== Tate–LaBianca trial ==
Manson, Krenwinkel, Van Houten, and Atkins went on trial on June 15, 1970. Watson was later tried separately as he was at the time in Texas fighting extradition. Kasabian, who had no direct involvement in the murders, was offered, and accepted, legal immunity.

During the sentencing phase of the trial, Atkins testified that she stabbed Tate. She stated that she had stabbed Tate because she was "sick of listening to her, pleading and begging, begging and pleading". Little credibility was given to Atkins's testimony in general, as it frequently contradicted known facts. She claimed "(Manson) told us that we were going to have to get on the stand and claim we had deliberately and remorselessly, and with no direction from him at all, committed all the murders ourselves".

Throughout the trial, Atkins and her co-defendants attempted to disrupt proceedings and were noted for both their lack of remorse for their victims and lack of concern for their own fate. They sang Manson-penned songs while being led to the courtroom. All four defendants were sentenced to death on March 29, 1971. Atkins was transferred to California's new women's death row in April 1971.

== Hinman trial ==
After the Tate/LaBianca trial, Atkins was convicted for the Hinman murder. She pleaded guilty to the charges against her. She testified she had not known Hinman was to be robbed or killed, although Atkins subsequently contradicted herself on this point in her 1977 autobiography.

== Imprisonment ==
Atkins arrived on California's death row on April 23, 1971, but her death sentence was automatically commuted to life in prison the next year following the California Supreme Court's People v. Anderson decision, which invalidated all death sentences imposed in California prior to 1972. In 1977, Atkins published her autobiography, Child of Satan, Child of God, in which she recounted the time she spent with Manson and the family, her religious conversion, and her prison experiences.

From 1974 onward, Atkins said she was a born-again Christian after seeing a vision of Jesus Christ in her cell. She became active in prison programs, teaching classes and received two commendations for assisting in emergency health interventions with other inmates, one of which was a suicide attempt.

Atkins married twice while in prison. Her first marriage was to inaccurately self-claimed millionaire Donald Lee Laisure on September 2, 1981, who she had met by mail. Atkins became Laisure's 36th wife, but the two divorced after he sought to marry yet again.

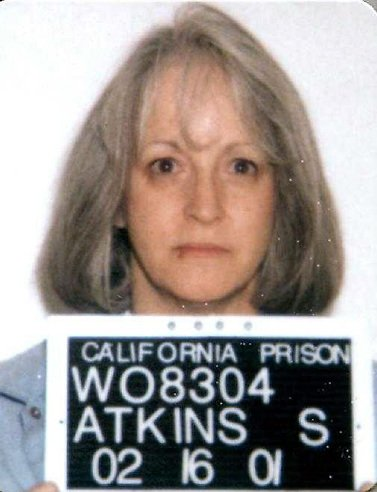
Atkins's mug shot, February 2001

In 1987, she married James W. Whitehouse, a graduate of Harvard Law School who was 15 years her junior. Whitehouse represented Atkins at her 2000 and 2005 parole hearings and maintained a website dedicated to her legal representation.

During Atkins's 2000 parole hearing, Sharon Tate's sister, Debra, read a statement written by their father, Paul, which said in part, "Thirty-one years ago I sat in a courtroom with a jury and watched with others. I saw a young woman who giggled, snickered and shouted out insults; even while testifying about my daughter's last breath, she laughed. My family was ripped apart. If Susan Atkins is released to rejoin her family, where is the justice?"

In April 2002, Atkins told a Los Angeles Times reporter of her work to discourage teenagers from idolizing Manson and her hope of someday leaving prison to live in Laguna Beach, California.

In 2003, Atkins filed a lawsuit in federal court claiming that she was a "political prisoner" due to the repeated denials of her parole requests regardless of her suitability.

On June 1, 2005, Atkins had her 17th parole hearing. The hearing was attended by various family members of the victims, including Debra Tate and members of the Sebring family, and they requested that her parole be denied. She received a four-year denial.

In April 2008, it was revealed that Atkins had been hospitalized for more than a month with an undisclosed illness that was subsequently reported to be terminal brain cancer. She was given less than six months to live and subsequently requested a "compassionate release" from prison. Atkins's attorney, Eric P. Lampel, stated that Atkins's condition had deteriorated to the point that she was paralyzed on one side, could only talk "a little bit", and could not sit up in bed without assistance. Her left leg was subsequently amputated.

=== Opinions on Atkins's release request ===
Vincent Bugliosi, who prosecuted Atkins, said he was not opposed to her release given her current condition, adding that she had paid "substantially, though not completely, for her horrendous crimes. Paying completely would mean imposing the death penalty." Bugliosi stated he supported her release to save the state money. The cost for Atkins's medical care since she was hospitalized on March 18, 2008, "reportedly surpassed $1.15 million with additional cost of over $300,000 to guard her hospital room." Bugliosi stated he was challenging the notion that "just because Susan Atkins showed no mercy to her victims, we therefore are duty-bound to follow her inhumanity and show no mercy to her."

Former prosecutor Stephen R. Kay, who prosecuted Manson supporters, opposed Atkins's release, stating:

Atkins married twice while in prison. For a long time, she got conjugal visits and Sharon Tate and the others were dead and buried long ago. So I think it's a matter of principle that she should not be granted clemency.

Kay also stated that he had attended about 60 parole hearings related to the murders and spent considerable time with the victims' families, witnessing their suffering.

Los Angeles County District Attorney Steve Cooley stated that he was strongly opposed to the release, saying in a letter to the board it would be "an affront to people of this state, the California criminal justice system and the next of kin of many murder victims." Cooley wrote that Atkins's "horrific crimes alone warrant a denial of her request" and that she "failed to demonstrate genuine remorse and lacks insight and understanding of the gravity of her crimes." Suzan Hubbard, director of adult prisons in California, also recommended against granting Atkins's request. California Governor Arnold Schwarzenegger opposed Atkins's release, stating:

I don't believe in [compassionate release]. I think that they have to stay in, they have to serve their time ... [T]hose kinds of crimes are just so unbelievable that I'm not for the compassionate release.

Orange County District Attorney Tony Rackauckas also opposed Atkins's release, stating that "It would be a grave miscarriage of justice to burden the citizens of Orange County by paroling her to Orange County, where she can enjoy the comforts of her husband, home and mercy she did not show Sharon Tate [or] her unborn baby."

=== Release hearing and results ===
The Board of Parole Hearings considered Atkins's request for compassionate release during its monthly meeting on July 15, 2008. During the 90-minute hearing, emotional pleas were made by both supporters and opponents of Atkins's release. The public hearing limited speakers' comments to five minutes each. After the board heard the case (as well as other agenda items), it retired to closed session for final deliberations. Due to her failing health, Atkins herself did not attend the hearing.

Debra Tate, by this point the only surviving immediate relative of murder victim Sharon Tate, spoke in opposition to a compassionate release for Atkins, stating, "She will be set free when judged by God. It's important that she die in incarceration." Pam Turner, a niece of Sharon Tate, also opposed Atkins's release, stating, "If she were capable of comprehending what our family's been through, she would be ashamed to come before this parole board and ask such a request." Anthony DiMaria, the nephew of murder victim Thomas Jay Sebring, also opposed Atkins's release, stating, "You will hear various opinions with respect to this today, but you will hear nothing from the nine people who lie in their graves and suffered horrendous deaths at the hands of Susan Atkins."

Gloria Goodwin Killian, director of ACWIP (Action Committee for Women in Prison) and a Pasadena legal researcher and prisoner advocate, spoke in support for Atkins's compassionate release, arguing, "Susan has been punished all that she can be. Short of going out to the hospital and physically torturing her, there is nothing left anyone can do to her. The people who are suffering are the people you see in this room today." In July 2008, Atkins' husband, James W. Whitehouse, told the board, "They tell me that if we're lucky we have three months and it's not going to be fun. Susan didn't ask for this release. I'm asking for this release. I promised her when I married her that I'd take care of her…I want to be there for her. The fact that this is going to save the state of California millions to guard someone who can’t sit up should be in our favor as well." (She ended up living over a year after this statement.)

Ultimately, after final deliberations the 11 members of the California Board of Parole Hearings unanimously declined to refer Atkins's request for compassionate release to the sentencing court. The decision—posted on its website—meant that Atkins's request would not be forwarded to the Los Angeles Superior Court that sentenced her, which would have had the final say as to whether she would be released. On September 24, 2008, Atkins was transferred back to the Central California Women's Facility in Chowchilla, California, to the facility's skilled nursing center.

Atkins' minimum eligible parole date was October 6, 1976. Her initial parole consideration hearing was on September 14, 1976, at which time she was denied parole. Prior to her 2009 parole hearing, a website maintained by her husband claimed that she was paralyzed over 85 percent of her body and unable to sit up or be transferred to a wheelchair. For the final time, Atkins was denied parole on September 2, 2009.

=== Death ===
Atkins died of brain cancer on September 24, 2009, at the Central California Women's Facility in Chowchilla. A prison spokesperson announced to reporters that her cause of death was listed as "natural causes". Her husband, James Whitehouse, subsequently released a statement saying that "Her last whispered word was 'Amen'."

== Media portrayals ==
Atkins was portrayed by Nancy Wolfe in the 1976 made-for-TV film Helter Skelter, and by Marguerite Moreau in that film's 2004 remake. She was played by Maureen Allisse in The Manson Family (2003), by Anjelica Scannura in Manson, My Name Is Evil (2009), by Devanny Pinn in House of Manson (2014), by Ambyr Childers in the 2015 TV series Aquarius, by Sarah Paulson in American Horror Story: Cult, by Kristine Hayworth in Prettyface, by Marianne Rendon in Charlie Says, and by Mikey Madison in Once Upon a Time in Hollywood.

== See also ==
- List of death row inmates in the United States
