= George Spahn =

American rancher (1889–1974)

- Born: George Christian Spahn; February 11, 1889; Philadelphia, Pennsylvania, U.S.
- Died: September 22, 1974 (aged 85); Los Angeles, California, U.S.
- Known for: Spahn Movie Ranch

George Christian Spahn (February 11, 1889 – September 22, 1974) was an American rancher who once owned the Spahn Ranch near Chatsworth, Los Angeles. Spahn rented the ranch to the movie industry to film Westerns, and later allowed Charles Manson and his "Family" of followers to live at the site.

== Early life ==
Spahn grew up in the greater Philadelphia area. His father died in a work accident when he was just two years old. Spahn had, at times, a tense relationship with his stepfather, who often exhibited vicious and violent behavior when he was drunk. Spahn left school after the third grade and started to work as a milkman. When he was 16, Spahn started an apprenticeship with a carpenter, but did not stay in this profession and eventually returned to the milk delivery business. He set up a business in Willow Grove owning five carriages and seven horses. He also employed his stepfather at this point.

Before he was 30, Spahn acquired a farm of 86 acres in Lansdale, where he kept 36 cows and some horses. He married the widow Martha Virginia Greenholtz, whom he had originally hired as a housekeeper for his farm. The couple had ten children together and also raised a daughter from Greenholtz's first marriage.

In the early 1930s, during the Great Depression, Spahn's milk business was facing difficulties and he felt somewhat disenchanted with his life in general. This led him to start over in California. He sold his farm and moved his family and favorite horses to Los Angeles. There he gave up on the milk business and turned to raising horses and offering horseback riding to tourists. In the late 1940s, he separated from his wife, and in 1953 bought the movie ranch that now carries his name. There he continued to raise horses and offer horse-riding trips.

He expanded the existing Western film sets on the ranch and rented them out to film and TV productions. In 1966, due to declining demand for Western film productions, his business went bankrupt. Spahn continued to live on the ranch, with most of its buildings, in particular the film sets, falling into disrepair.

== Manson Family ==
Spahn is chiefly remembered for his association with the Manson Family, due to his tolerance of the Manson group's residence on his property. Spahn housed Charles Manson and his followers at the ranch from 1968 on. The 1969 Tate–LaBianca murders by Manson's devotees were allegedly hatched at the Spahn Ranch.

Manson persuaded Spahn to permit "the Family" to live at his ranch. Manson ordered the women in the group to clean and cook for the nearly blind 80-year-old. The women also acted as seeing eye guides for Spahn. Spahn nicknamed all the Manson girls, including Squeaky, Sadie Mae, and Ouisch. According to Manson Family member Paul Watkins, Mansonite Lynette "Squeaky" Fromme got her nickname because of the sound she made when Spahn ran his hand up her thigh. Family member Charles Watson has written that his own nickname, "Tex", was given to him by Spahn, who recognized his Texas accent.

Spahn lived for five years after the murders. For the first year he stayed on the ranch with some of the women of the Manson Family until it was destroyed in a large wildfire in September 1970. He was eventually admitted to the Sherwood Convalescent Hospital in Van Nuys, where he died on September 22, 1974, at the age of 85. He was buried in Eternal Valley Memorial Park in nearby Newhall.

== In popular culture ==
- In the 1973 documentary Manson, Spahn himself can be seen as an old man.
- In the 1976 TV movie Helter Skelter, based on prosecutor Vincent Bugliosi's book of the same name, Spahn is portrayed by Ray Middleton (1907–1984).
- In the 2018 film Charlie Says, Spahn is portrayed by John Gowans.
- In Quentin Tarantino's 2019 film Once Upon a Time in Hollywood, Spahn is portrayed by Bruce Dern. Burt Reynolds was initially cast as Spahn, but died in September 2018, approximately two weeks before shooting was slated to begin.
