= Spahn Ranch =

Spahn Ranch Spahn Movie Ranch
- Ranch
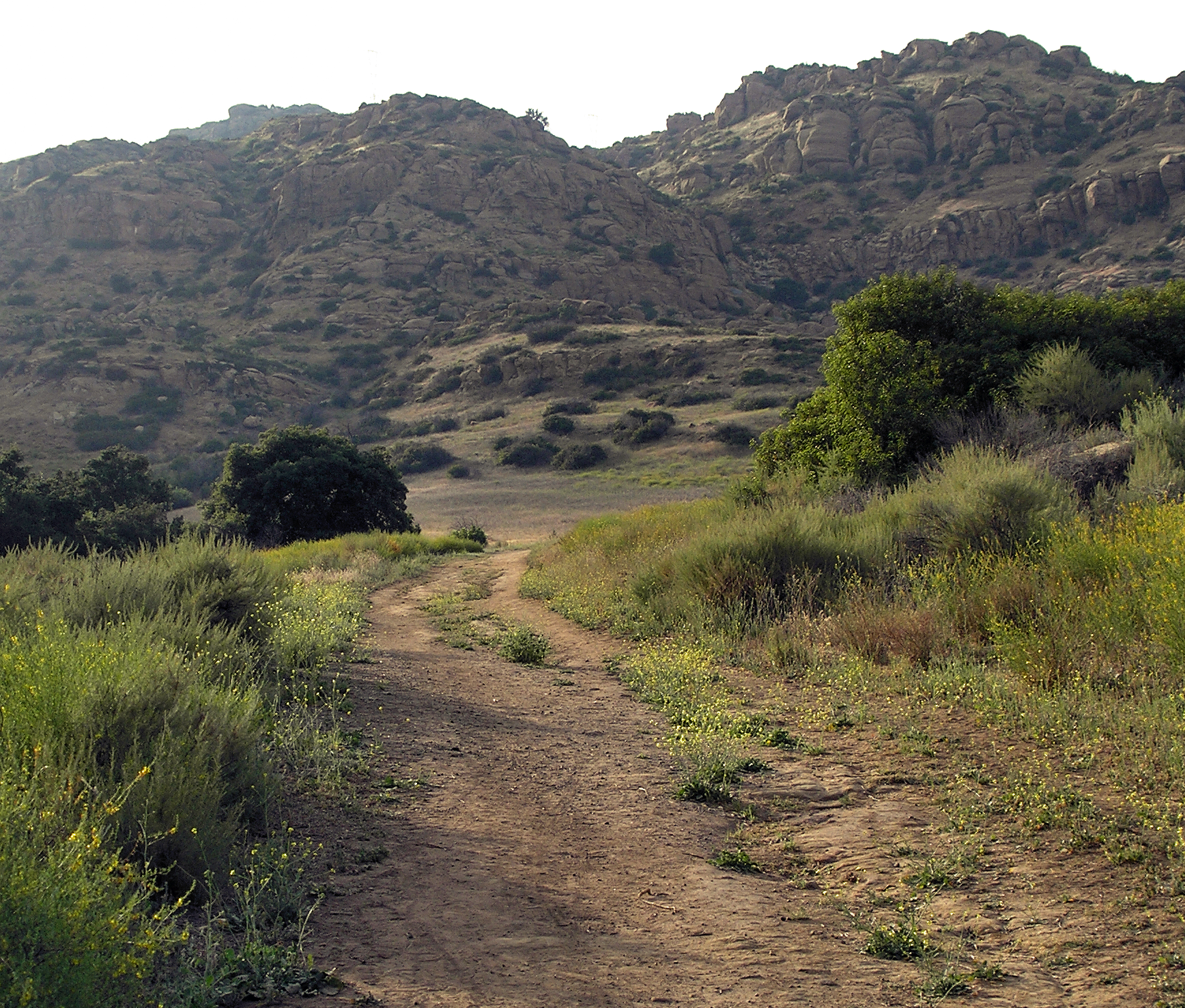
- The Spahn Movie Ranch, with a portion of a back road.

- Location within Los Angeles County
- Coordinates: 34°16′18″N 118°36′59″W
- Country: United States
- State: California
- County: Los Angeles
- Built: 1947
- Founder: Lee and Ruth McReynolds

Area
  - Total: 55 acres (22 ha)
- Elevation: 1,362 ft (415 m)
- Time zone: UTC-8 (PST)
  - Summer (DST): UTC-7 (PDT)

Spahn Ranch, also known as the Spahn Movie Ranch, was a 55-acre (22.26 hectare) movie ranch in Los Angeles, California. For a period it was used as a ranch, dairy farm and later movie set during the era of westerns. After a decline in use for filming by the 1950s, its owner George Spahn established a stable for renting horses for riding on the varied acres. It became known in the late 20th century as the primary headquarters of Charles Manson and his cult followers, the "Manson Family", for much of 1968 through 1970. They were notorious for the Tate–LaBianca murders of August 1969.

The entrance to the historic ranch was originally at 12000 Santa Susana Pass Road (street numbers have since been changed) of the Simi Hills and Santa Susana Mountains above Chatsworth, California. It is no longer in use. After Spahn's death and a wildfire that destroyed the main ranch house and outbuildings, the land was incorporated into Santa Susana Pass State Historic Park.

== History ==
=== 1880s–1968: Initial ownership and movie ranch ===
Beginning in the 1880s, a piece of land, including what would later become the Spahn Ranch, became the homestead of Mexican immigrant Dionisio Sánchez and Hoosier James R. Williams, along with their families.

The property was purchased in 1928 by Sharon M. Atkins and in 1947 by couple Lee and Ruth McReynolds. Lee built some movie sets next to his trading post on the property to catch some overflow from the Iverson Movie Ranch. With mountainous terrain, boulder-strewn scenery and an "old Western town" set, Spahn Ranch was a suitable filming site for westerns and had been used mostly for B movies and TV series.

In 1953, McReynolds sold the site to dairy farmer George Spahn, and it became known as the Spahn Ranch. He continued to allow some filming there. Much of the information reported about specific productions filmed there is unreliable. The rumor that the location was used for the film Duel in the Sun (1946) is now known to be false. Among the productions said to have been filmed at Spahn Ranch are The Lone Ranger with Clayton Moore, and several episodes of the Bonanza television series. Spahn Ranch is also often cited as the filming location for the B-movie The Creeping Terror (1964).

After the decline of filming and his dairy business, Spahn added more sets and rental horses. The ranch became popular among locals as a place to go horseback riding. By the late 1960s, however, the ranch became almost deserted.

=== 1968–1969: Manson Family headquarters ===
Spahn was 80 years old, going blind and living at his ranch when he allowed the Manson Family to move in, rent-free, in exchange for labor. The family did daily chores and helped run the horse-rental business, which had become Spahn's main source of income. Manson Family member Lynette Fromme later wrote, "I was impressed with George Spahn's hardiness. He was eighty years old and, although his blindness had for five or six years kept him in a world apart, he was mentally still present, living alone and working through all the frustrations of having lost authority in the running of his own business."

On August 16, 1969, after the Tate–LaBianca murders, more than one hundred officers from the Special Enforcement Detail (the SWAT team of the Los Angeles County Sheriff's Department) were deployed at Spahn Ranch in what authors Tom O'Neill and Dan Piepenbring have alleged was the largest documented police raid in California history in their book CHAOS: Charles Manson, the CIA, and the Secret History of the Sixties, resulting in the arrest of several Manson Family members due to suspicion of their participation in an automobile theft ring (unrelated to the later arrest of those involved in the murders).

Ten days later, on August 26, ranch hand Donald "Shorty" Shea was lured to a remote spot on the ranch where he was ambushed and killed by Bruce M. Davis, Steve "Clem" Grogan, and Tex Watson. The Family members allegedly believed he had reported them to the police, leading to the August 16 raid. His remains were not found until December 1977, when Grogan agreed to lead investigators to the spot where Shea had been buried. Spahn was unaware of the reason for Shea's disappearance; he was never accused of any role in the 1969 murders for which several Family members were later convicted.

In late 1969, Robert Hendrickson began filming the Manson Family at the ranch for his documentary Manson, including Spahn, Lynette "Squeaky" Fromme, Bruce Davis, Nancy Pitman, Catherine "Gypsy" Share, Sandra Good, Paul Watkins and others.

=== 1970–present: fire, Spahn's death, and incorporation into a state park ===
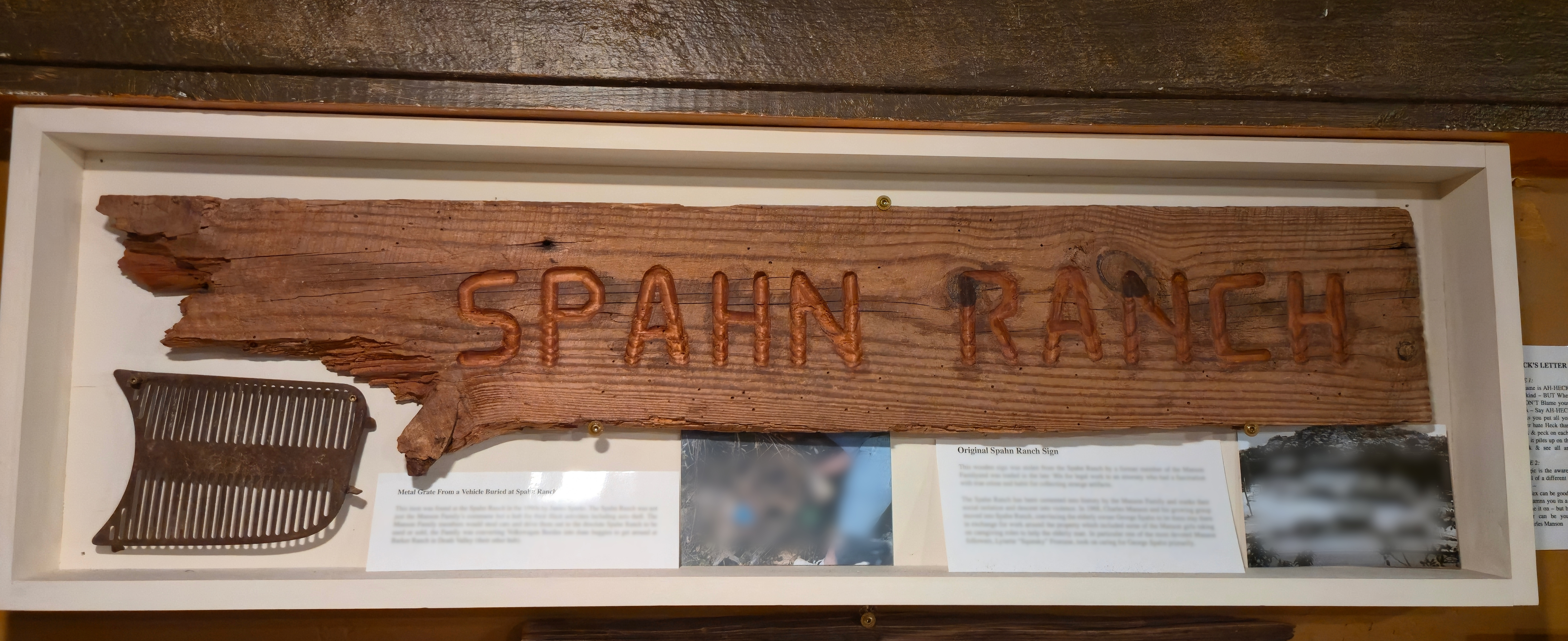
Original Spahn Ranch wooden sign on display at Graveface Museum in Savannah, Georgia

The Clampitt Fire destroyed all of the Spahn Movie Ranch's film sets and residential structures in September 1970. George Spahn died on September 22, 1974, and is buried in Eternal Valley Memorial Park in nearby Newhall.

The Spahn Movie Ranch site is now part of California's Santa Susana Pass State Historic Park, the "Devil's Slide" section of the historic Old Santa Susana Stage Road being located on the park's western side. Several hiking trails give access to extensive views of the San Fernando Valley.

== In popular culture ==
Spahn Movie Ranch is a setting in Once Upon a Time in Hollywood (2019), a drama film written and directed by Quentin Tarantino and set in 1969 at the time of the Tate–LaBianca murders. The scenes for the movie were filmed at the nearby Corriganville Park in Simi Valley, which was also a movie ranch at one time. George Spahn was played by Bruce Dern. Pop singer Janet Jackson filmed her music video "Someone to Call My Lover" (2001) on the ranch.

== See also ==
- Burro Flats Painted Cave
- Santa Susana Pass
