= Barker Ranch =

- Mining
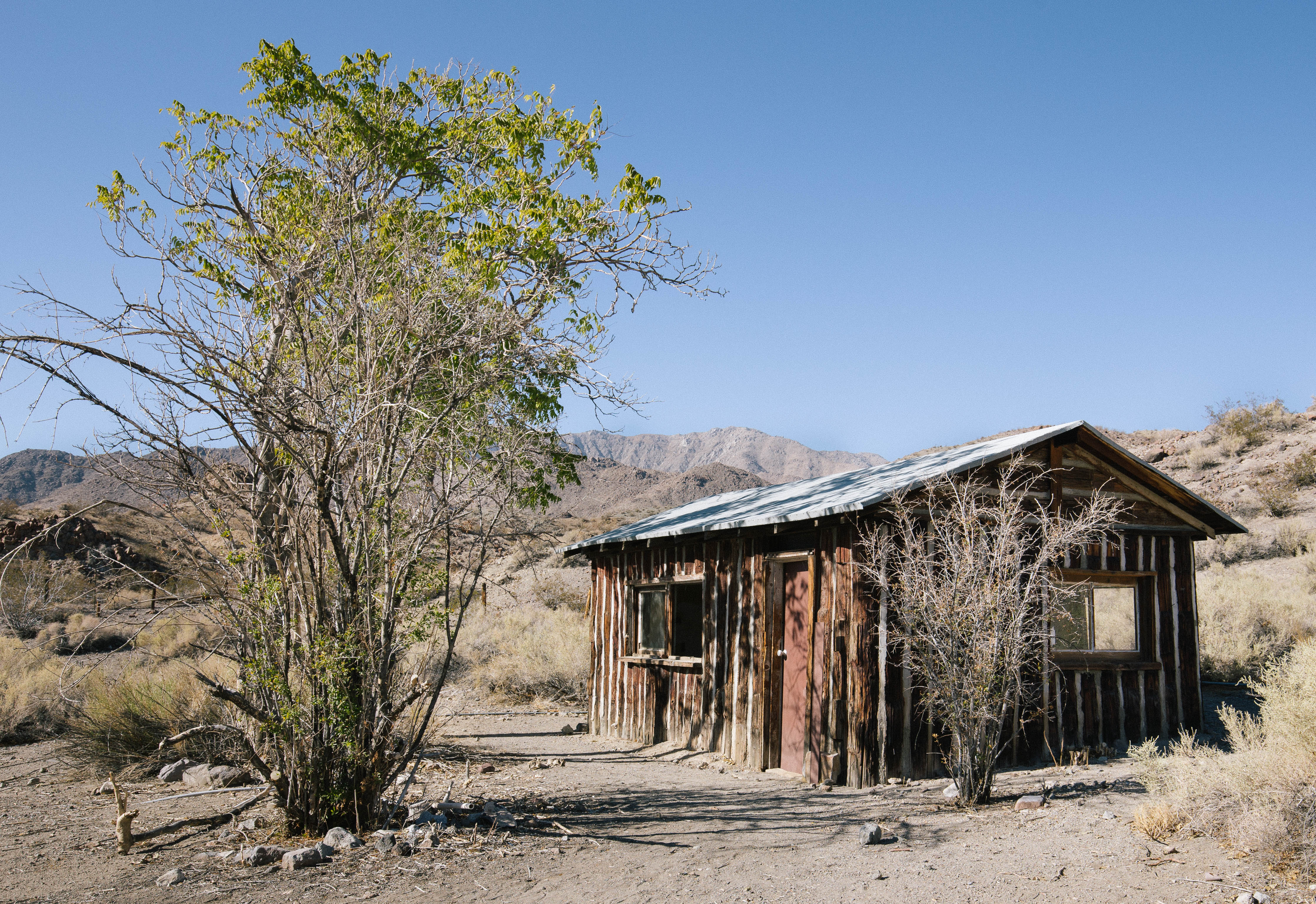
- Abandoned building at Barker Ranch
- Interactive map of Barker Ranch
- Coordinates: 35°51′34.57″N 117°5′18.76″W
- Country: United States
- State: California
- County: Inyo
- Built: 1940s
- Founder: Bluch and Helen Thomason
- Elevation: 3,247 ft (990 m)
- Time zone: UTC-8 (Pacific (PST))
  - Summer (DST): UTC-7 (PDT)

Barker Ranch is located inside Death Valley National Park in eastern California. Used as a mining and recreational property from the 1940s to the 1960s, it is infamous due to its association with Charles Manson and his "family". It was the family's de facto headquarters.

== Early history ==
Barker Ranch (California)

Barker Ranch is located in a rock- and boulder-filled valley in the Panamint Range. It is accessible only by sandy, primitive and rugged roads. Streams feed this little valley and provide much vegetation. There is a small one-room guest house located to the side of the main house. There is also a five-thousand-gallon "swimming pool" (in reality a reservoir to store water from the spring) made from cement and rock boulders towards the back of the property.

Bluch and Helen Thomason began construction of Barker Ranch around 1940. It was originally used as a storage and shop facility to support their mining activity in the area. They constructed a small cabin and out building, with electricity provided by a windmill and generator, and drinking water from a nearby spring. In 1950, Bluch Thomason died and the ranch became a seasonal vacation property.

The ranch was sold to James and Arlene Barker of Oklahoma in 1955. The Barkers engaged in gold and uranium mining in the area through the rest of the 1950s and the 1960s. To accommodate their family gatherings, the Barkers enlarged the house and constructed more out buildings.

=== Myers Ranch ===
The closest habitation to Barker Ranch is Myers Ranch. The ranch was built in 1932 by Bill and Barbara Myers. The Myers family resided on the property until 1960 when they relocated to Fresno. Myers Ranch is currently a 40-acre (16 ha) private inholding within Death Valley National Park owned by the Myers family.

== Manson Family headquarters (1968–1969) ==
In 1968, Charles Manson learned about the Myers Ranch from Catherine Gillies, the granddaughter of Barbara Myers. Starting in November 1968, Manson and others began staying at the ranch and discovered the nearby Barker Ranch. The buildings at Barker Ranch being in better condition, the Family relocated there and later obtained Arlene Barker's permission to use the property on a temporary basis. At times, the Family was using both properties.

Manson family were there for less than a month and a half, and were arrested in raids on 10 October 1969 and 12 October 1969.

"Some of the family members burned an NPS tractor which caught the attention of law enforcement officials. After Barker Ranch was raided and the Manson family members were jailed for vandalism, it became apparent they were involved with horrific murders in Los Angeles."

The Inyo County sheriff department, California Highway Patrol, and National Park Service Law Enforcement Rangers captured the group in raids on October 10 and October 12, 1969. Manson was caught hiding under the bathroom sink. At the time of his arrest they were unaware of the magnitude of their find. They wanted to prosecute the persons responsible for vandalism within Death Valley National Monument further north, unaware that they had a mass-murder suspect and his followers.

In early 1970, members of the Manson Family were filmed by Robert Hendrickson at Barker Ranch, sorting through, and taking evidence left behind by detectives, for the making of the Oscar-nominated documentary Manson.

In 1971, Arlene Barker ceased to file reports with the Bureau of Land Management (BLM) on the family's mining activity. The land (and improvements) then reverted to government control. In 1976, the ranch became part of the California Desert Conservation Area. In 1994, it was incorporated into Death Valley National Park.

Today the remnants of the ranch belong to National Park Service.

== Subsequent events ==
In early 2008, after decades of persistent rumors of additional Manson family murder victims, forensic investigators performed testing at the ranch for possible buried human remains. Using state of the art technology not available in the 1960s, investigators located several sites consistent with possible clandestine graves. In May 2008, investigators conducted a "dig" at the sites; however, further searching by authorities was called off due to finding no evidence or victim remains during the search.

Due to a fire in May 2009, most of the main structure has been destroyed with only the concrete and rock portion of the cabin still standing.
