= Conspiracy to murder =

Crime of intending to commit murder

Conspiracy to murder is a statutory offence defined by the intent to commit murder.

== England and Wales ==
The offence of conspiracy to murder was created in statutory law by section 4 of the Offences Against the Person Act 1861 and retained as an offence by virtue of section 1(1) of the Criminal Law Act 1977.

Mens rea: Although an intention to cause grievous bodily harm is sufficient for murder, it is not sufficient for conspiracy to murder.

=== Jurisdiction ===
Section 1(4) of the Criminal Law Act 1977 formerly provided that it was immaterial that the murder in question would not be triable in England and Wales if committed in accordance with the intention of the parties to the agreement. This reproduced the effect of section 4 of the 1861 Act.

See now section 1A of the Criminal Law Act 1977.

=== Sentence ===
A person guilty of conspiracy to murder is liable to imprisonment for life or for any shorter term.

As to the maximum sentence in a case where the agreement was entered into before Part I of the Criminal Law Act 1977 came into force, see section 5(5) of that Act.

See the Crown Prosecution Service sentencing manual.

The following cases are relevant:

- R v Khalil and others
- R v McNee, Russell and Gunn
- R v Barot (see Dhiren Barot)

== Northern Ireland ==
Conspiracy to murder is an offence by virtue of article 9(1) of the Criminal Attempts and Conspiracy (Northern Ireland) Order 1983 (S.I. 1983/1120 (N.I. 13)).

=== Jurisdiction ===
See, formerly, article 9(4) of that Order.

=== Sentence ===
See article 11(2)(a).

== Republic of Ireland ==
The offence of conspiracy to murder is created by section 4 of the Offences against the Person Act 1861.

== Canada ==
Section 465 of the country's Criminal Code makes conspiracy to commit murder an indictable offence, punishable by a maximum term of life imprisonment.

== Australia ==
The law varies between states with the maximum sentence for this offence being 14 years' imprisonment in Queensland and 25 years' imprisonment in New South Wales.

== New Zealand ==
In New Zealand law, the penalty for the offence of conspiracy to murder is up to 10 years imprisonment, which is set out in section 175 of the Crimes Act 1961. The intended murder need not happen in New Zealand.

== United States ==
Conspiracy to murder is a defined crime in most jurisdictions in the United States, and normally does not require a murder actually occurring. Federally, it is punishable under Title 18 by up to life imprisonment.
