= Tex Watson =

Manson family member, convicted murderer (born 1945)

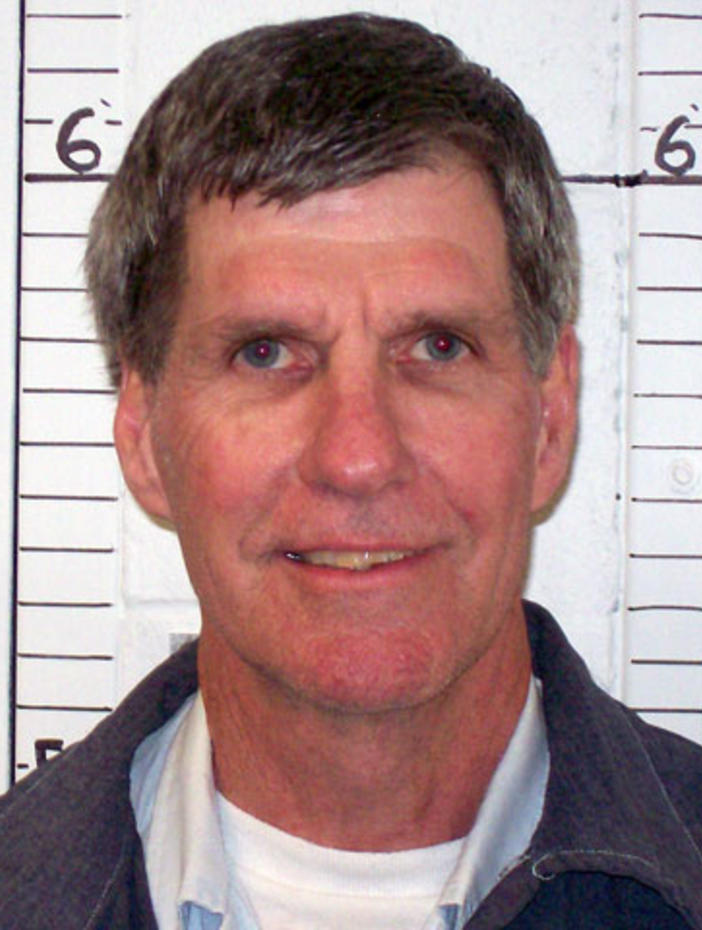
- Watson in an undated prison photograph
- Born: Charles Denton Watson; December 2, 1945 (age 80); Dallas, Texas, U.S.
- Other names: Charles Montgomery; Texas Charlie ("Tex")
- Spouse: Kristin Joan Svege (m. 1979; div. 2003)
- Children: 4
- Status: Incarcerated
- Allegiance: Manson Family
- Convictions: First degree murder (7 counts); Conspiracy to commit murder
- Penalty: Death; commuted to life imprisonment with the possibility of parole after 7 years

Details
- Date: August 9–10, 1969
- Killed: 8 (including an unborn child)
- Date apprehended: November 30, 1969
- Imprisoned at: Richard J. Donovan Correctional Facility

Charles Denton "Tex" Watson (born December 2, 1945) is an American mass murderer and former central member of the "Manson Family" led by Charles Manson. Watson is frequently identified as the tactical ringleader of the Tate–LaBianca murders, carried out on August 9–10, 1969. On the first night, he, Patricia Krenwinkel, and Susan Atkins murdered Sharon Tate, who was eight months pregnant, along with Jay Sebring, Wojciech Frykowski, Abigail Folger, and Steven Parent at 10050 Cielo Drive in Benedict Canyon, Los Angeles. The following night, Watson traveled to Los Feliz and participated in the murders of Leno and Rosemary LaBianca. He was convicted of murder in 1971 and sentenced to death. After the California Supreme Court invalidated the state's death penalty in 1972, his sentence was commuted to life imprisonment. Watson became eligible for parole in 1976 and has been denied parole 18 times.

== Early life ==
Charles Denton Watson was born on December 2, 1945, in Dallas, Texas, and grew up in nearby Copeville. He was the youngest of three children. Watson attended church locally and participated in a range of school activities; he was an honor student, editor of the school paper, captain of the football team, and set a high-hurdles record at Farmersville High School. In September 1964, he moved to Denton, Texas, to attend the University of North Texas, where he joined the Pi Kappa Alpha fraternity.

== Introduction to Manson Family ==
In January 1967, Watson began working for Braniff International as a baggage handler. When his funds ran low, he used free airline tickets provided as an employee benefit to visit a former fraternity brother in Los Angeles, where he became interested in the psychedelic music and lifestyle emerging in the late 1960s. While driving one day, Watson picked up a hitchhiker, Dennis Wilson of the Beach Boys, and drove him to Wilson's home. There, he was first introduced to members of the Manson Family, who were living with Wilson at the time.

== Time at Spahn Ranch ==
Watson lived with the Manson Family at Spahn Ranch for nine months before the crimes, during which he became close to Manson. The ranch's nearly blind 80-year-old owner, George Spahn gave him the nickname "Tex", due to his accent. According to Los Angeles County District Attorney Vincent Bugliosi, Manson used "a variety of techniques" to influence Watson and other followers, ultimately leading them to participate in Manson's belief that a large‑scale race war—referred to by Manson as "Helter Skelter," after the Beatles song—was imminent and would result in his rise to power.

== Drug dealing and Bernard Crowe ==
In December 1968, Watson left the Manson Family. He moved in with a woman who sold small quantities of marijuana and LSD to his friends, and the two became romantically involved. They lived in Hollywood for several months, during which their drug‑related activity increased, before Watson became restless and returned to the Family.

Acting on Manson’s instruction to "find money for Helter Skelter," Watson arranged to steal money from Bernard Crowe, a friend of the woman he had been living with. Crowe telephoned Spahn Ranch, spoke with Manson, and threatened to come to the ranch and kill those present if the money was not returned. Manson responded by shooting Crowe in the stomach, using the same pistol that Watson later used in the Tate murders.

Watson and Crowe encountered one another again at the California Men's Colony in the early 1980s. After a lengthy conversation about the past and about religion, Crowe forgave Watson for his involvement in the theft and the shooting.

== Tate–LaBianca murders ==
=== Tate murders ===
On August 9, 1969, as a member of the Manson Family, Watson led Susan Atkins, Linda Kasabian, and Patricia Krenwinkel to 10050 Cielo Drive, the home of Roman Polanski and Sharon Tate. The group murdered all four people inside the residence, as well as Steven Parent in the driveway. Watson and the others inflicted 28 stab wounds on one of the victims, Abigail Folger.

=== LaBianca murders ===
The following night, Watson and six others went to the home of Leno and Rosemary LaBianca. Manson and Watson entered the residence. According to Watson's book Will You Die For Me?, Manson held the occupants at gunpoint while Watson tied them up, after which other members of the Manson Family killed the couple.

=== Conviction ===
On October 2, 1969, Watson fled Spahn Ranch and returned to Texas. On November 30, 1969, he was arrested there in connection with the Tate–LaBianca murders. He and his attorneys contested extradition to California for nine months. After being transferred to California, he stopped speaking and eating, lost 55 pounds, and began exhibiting symptoms of a catatonic state. He was admitted to Atascadero State Hospital for a ninety‑day evaluation to determine his competency to stand trial. He remained there until February 1971, when he was found competent.

On October 12, 1971, Watson was convicted of seven counts of first-degree murder and one count of conspiracy to commit murder. One week later, the same jury determined, after two and a half hours of deliberation, that he was legally sane. On October 21, 1971, he was sentenced to death. He was placed on California's death row on November 17, 1971, but his sentence was commuted to life imprisonment after the California Supreme Court's People v. Anderson decision invalidated all death sentences imposed in the state prior to 1972. Watson was convicted of the murders of seven people: Abigail Folger; Wojciech Frykowski; Steven Parent; Sharon Tate Polanski, who was eight months pregnant; Jay Sebring; Leno LaBianca; and Rosemary LaBianca.

== Incarceration ==
According to his prisoner-outreach website, Watson converted to Christianity in 1975. Will You Die for Me?, Watson's autobiography, as told to Raymond "Chaplain Ray" Hoekstra, was published in 1978. In 1979, he married Kristin Joan Svege, and together they founded Abounding Love Ministries, Inc. in 1980. Through conjugal visits, they had four children, but such visits for life prisoners were banned in October 1996. After 24 years of marriage, Svege divorced Watson in 2003 after meeting another man, though the two remain friends. Watson became an ordained minister in 1981 and received a B.S. in Business Management in 2009 from California Coast University, a distance-learning college.

In August 1982, a Southern California–based group, Citizens for Truth, submitted approximately 80,000 petition signatures and several thousand letters opposing Watson's parole. The group received support from Doris Tate, the mother of victim Sharon Tate. In subsequent years, the group, along with Doris Tate and her daughters Patricia and Debra, submitted petitions containing more than two million signatures.

In May 2023, Watson launched the Abounding Love podcast, which features sermons he delivered between 1977 and 1984 in the chapel of the California Men's Colony in San Luis Obispo, California.

In 2012, Watson contested a request to release recordings he made in 1969 with his defense attorney, Bill Boyd. The recordings became part of a bankruptcy proceeding involving Boyd's law firm. Members of the Los Angeles Police Department stated that they believed the tapes might contain information relevant to unsolved murder cases associated with the Manson Family. Watson asked the presiding judge to permit police to listen to the recordings but not take possession of them. Judge Richard A. Schell ruled that Watson had waived attorney–client privilege by allowing the co‑author of his 1978 memoir to hear the tapes. The LAPD obtained the recordings, which reportedly included Watson discussing additional killings, but were said to contain no new information. In September 2014, Richard Pfeiffer, an attorney for Leslie Van Houten, stated that he was considering subpoenaing the tapes for material that might assist Van Houten at a future parole hearing.

Watson's minimum eligible parole date was November 26, 1976. He has been denied parole 18 times, including two stipulations. At an October 2021 parole board hearing, he received a five‑year denial. He remains incarcerated at Richard J. Donovan Correctional Facility in San Diego County, California.

== In popular culture ==
- In the tenth episode of American Horror Story: Cult, Watson is portrayed by Billy Eichner.
- In the 2018 film Charlie Says, he is played by Chace Crawford.
- In Quentin Tarantino's 2019 film Once Upon a Time in Hollywood, a fictionalized version of him is portrayed by Austin Butler.
- In 2019, he was portrayed by Christopher Backus in David Fincher's Netflix series Mindhunter.
- A graffito in John Waters' 1972 film Pink Flamingos reads "Free Tex Watson".

== See also ==
- List of longest prison sentences served
- Female Trouble
- List of people from Texas
