= Helter Skelter (2004 film) =

American television film

- DVD cover
- Based on: Helter Skelter by Vincent Bugliosi; Curt Gentry
- Written by: John Gray
- Directed by: John Gray
- Starring: Jeremy Davies; Clea DuVall; Allison Smith; Frank Zieger; Eric Dane; Bruno Kirby
- Theme music composer: Mark Snow
- Country of origin: United States
- Original language: English

Production
- Producer: Vincent Bugliosi
- Cinematography: Don E. FauntLeRoy
- Editor: Scott Vickrey
- Running time: 137 minutes (DVD)
- Production companies: The Wolper Organization Lakeside Productions; Warner Bros. Television

Original release
- Release: May 16, 2004

Helter Skelter is a 2004 television film written and directed by John Gray, based on the 1974 non-fiction book by Vincent Bugliosi and Curt Gentry about the murders of the Manson Family. The film is the second film to be based on the Charles Manson murders, following the 1976 two-part TV movie of the same name. Unlike the 1976 version, which focused mainly on the police investigation and the murder trial (as did the book), this version focused mainly on Linda Kasabian's involvement with the Manson Family and their development.

== Plot ==
After breaking up with her husband, 19-year-old single mother Linda Kasabian seeks refuge with the Manson Family at Spahn Ranch and witnesses their indoctrination techniques. After attending the killings at the Sharon Tate house she flees Spahn Ranch but the Manson Family keeps her daughter in their custody, knowing that this will force her to return. Her daughter and all of the other children are taken by Social Services during a raid on Spahn Ranch after Manson burns municipal earthmoving equipment that he believes is being used to make it harder for him to find the "bottomless pit" that he believes is described in Revelation 9 and "Revolution 9". The case is dropped due to an improperly executed warrant but confessions from Sadie and interviews with Kitty lead investigators to connect the Hinman, Tate, and LaBianca killings and issue warrants for the members of the Manson Family. Joey Dimarco and Paul Watkins explain to the detectives how the words "Helter Skelter" and "Pig" found written in blood at the crime scenes are related to the worldview of the Manson Family derived from passages in the Book of Revelation and the lyrics of the Beatles, thereby connecting Manson's philosophy to the murders themselves as acts intended to spark a race war he dubbed "Helter Skelter". Manson dismisses his counsel and represents himself at trial but is deemed unfit after disrupting proceedings. Linda Kasabian is given an immunity deal and ends up giving detailed testimony at trial. The accused members of the Manson Family are ultimately convicted of the murders but California repeals the death penalty in 1972, making them all eligible for parole.

== Cast ==
- Jeremy Davies as Charles Manson
- Clea DuVall as Linda Kasabian
- Marguerite Moreau as Susan Atkins
- Allison Smith as Patricia Krenwinkel
- Frank Zieger as Steve Grogan
- Eric Dane as Tex Watson
- Bruno Kirby as Vincent Bugliosi
- Mary Lynn Rajskub as Lynette Fromme
- Catherine Wadkins as Leslie Van Houten
- Michael Weston as Bobby Beausoleil
- Hal Ozsan as Joey Dimarco
- Whitney Dylan as Sharon Tate
- Marek Probosz as Roman Polanski
- David Ackert as Jerry Rubin
- Danielle De Cerbo as Bernardine Dohrn
- Rick Gomez as Milio
- Robert Joy as Detective Morrisy
- Graham Beckel as Jerry
- Chris Ellis as Sergeant Whiteley
- Isabella Hofmann as Rosemary LaBianca
- Robert Costanzo as Leno LaBianca
- Yvonne Delarosa as Catherine Share
- Chris Jacobs as Dennis Wilson
- Jeffrey Johnson as Terry Melcher
