= Irving Kanarek =

American lawyer (1920–2020)

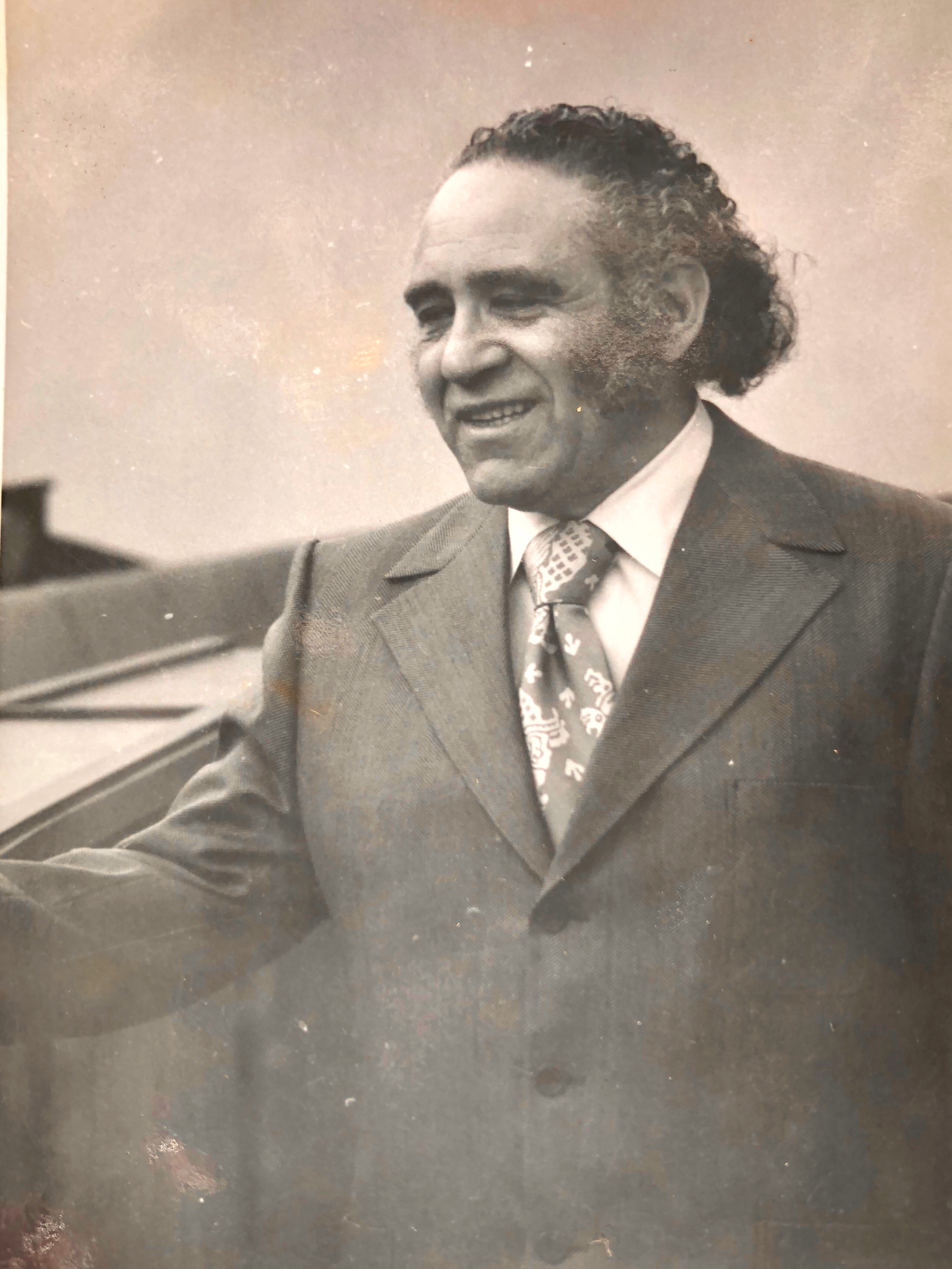
- Irving Kanarek
- Born: Irving Allan Kanarek; May 12, 1920; Seattle, Washington, U.S.
- Died: September 2, 2020 (aged 100); Garden Grove, California, U.S.
- Occupations: Criminal lawyer & aerospace engineer
- Known for: Representing defendants such as cult leader Charles Manson and kidnapper Jimmy Lee Smith
- Notable work: Invented a corrosion inhibitor for Inhibited Red Fuming Nitric Acid for the Army's Project Nike

Irving Allan Kanarek (May 12, 1920 – September 2, 2020) was an aerospace engineer and a criminal defense attorney, best known for representing defendants such as Charles Manson and Jimmy Lee Smith.

== Background ==
Kanarek was born in Seattle. His first career was as an aerospace engineer working for North American Aviation (NAA), where he invented a corrosion inhibitor for Inhibited Red Fuming Nitric Acid for the Army's Project Nike.

In 1954, while employed as a chemical engineer for North American Aviation, Kanarek had his security clearance revoked by the Air Force on suspicion of communist associations. He successfully sued for reinstatement of the clearance and back pay. He attended the University of Washington as an undergraduate and later Loyola Law School. He was admitted to the California Bar in 1957. He married, fathered two daughters, and later divorced.

In 1989, he suffered a mental breakdown and was hospitalised for psychiatric evaluation. The following year, the state bar took control of his license amid personal and financial difficulties, and ultimately he lost his law license.

== Legal tactics ==
According to Tate-LaBianca prosecutor Vincent Bugliosi, Kanarek was legendary in Los Angeles courts for his dilatory, obstructionist tactics. In his book, Helter Skelter, Bugliosi claimed Kanarek, in a different case, had once objected to a witness identifying himself: Kanarek claimed that the witness's name was hearsay because the witness had first heard it from his mother.

In the Tate-LaBianca trial, Kanarek objected nine times during opening statements, despite continuous censure by Judge Charles Older. During a later objection, he called witness Linda Kasabian insane, and by the third day of the trial, he had objected more than 200 times. Bugliosi, also wrote of Kanarek as opposing counsel during the Manson case saying: "The press focused on his bombast and missed his effectiveness. He fought as if he were personally on trial." During the course of the trial he was jailed twice by Judge Older for contempt of court. In his summation, Bugliosi dubbed Kanarek "the Toscanini of Tedium".

Kanarek believed fiercely in the constitutional right to counsel, and that everyone was entitled to their day in court. He said: "I would defend a client who I knew was guilty of horrific crimes. They have to be proved guilty. I've had cases where people were guilty as hell but they couldn't prove it. And if they can't prove it, he's not guilty. In that case, the person walks free. That's American justice."

== Later life and death ==
Throughout his later life, Kanarek lived in Orange County, California. He spent his last years at a care facility in Garden Grove, California, and died there on September 2, 2020, at the age of 100.

=== Legacy ===
In November 2008, a stage play premiered at Caltech in Pasadena, California, entitled Rocket Girl, about the life of Mary Sherman Morgan, a former co-worker of Kanarek at North American Aviation. The play was written by her son, George D. Morgan. The character of Kanarek appears throughout most of the play. The play was later turned into a book of the same name.
