= CHAOS: Charles Manson, the CIA, and the Secret History of the Sixties =

2019 nonfiction book by Tom O'Neill with Dan Piepenbring

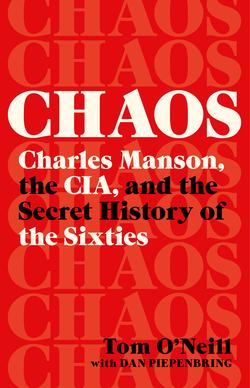
- US first edition cover
- Author: Tom O'Neill with Dan Piepenbring
- Audio read by: Kevin Stillwell
- Cover artist: Lauren Harms (design)
- Language: English
- Subjects: Tate–LaBianca murders
- Publisher: Little, Brown and Company
- Publication date: June 25, 2019
- Publication place: New York
- Media type: Print (hardcover and paperback), e-book, audiobook
- Pages: 528
- ISBN: 978-0-316-47755-0 (hardcover)
- OCLC: 1104138801
- Dewey Decimal: 364.152/340979493
- LC Class: HV6533.C2 O545 2019

CHAOS: Charles Manson, the CIA, and the Secret History of the Sixties is a 2019 nonfiction book written by Tom O'Neill with Dan Piepenbring. The book presents O'Neill's research into the background and motives for the Tate–LaBianca murders committed by the Manson Family in 1969. O'Neill questions the Helter Skelter scenario argued by lead prosecutor Vincent Bugliosi in the trials and in his book Helter Skelter (1974). The book's title is a reference to the covert CIA program Operation CHAOS.

A documentary film based on the book, CHAOS: The Manson Murders, directed by Errol Morris, was released by Netflix in March 2025.

== Background ==
In 1999, entertainment reporter Tom O'Neill accepted a three-month assignment from the film magazine Premiere to write about how the Tate–LaBianca murders changed Hollywood. O'Neill missed his deadline but continued to investigate the murders. CHAOS is the product of twenty years of meticulous research, hundreds of interviews, and falling-outs with publishers that led to financial and legal repercussions for O'Neill.

The investigation consumed O'Neill's time and led him in many directions, some that ultimately led nowhere. However, he uncovered revelatory information that he felt significantly shifted the narrative surrounding the Manson case. He filed several Freedom of Information requests with the help of his father, William O'Neill, a lawyer. O'Neill's investigation left him with a massive compilation of notes, documents and photographs. He wrote the book in collaboration with Dan Piepenbring, who he credited with helping him condense the masses of information that he had compiled over 20 years into a 520-page book accompanied by extensive endnotes.

O'Neill had signed a book contract with Penguin Press and received a large cash advance which allowed him to support himself and continue his reporting. After many pushed deadlines, the publisher sued O'Neill for the return of the money and canceled the deal. He lived very frugally, sacrificing time and leisure in his search for the truth. He also used loans from his family and took to driving for Uber to support his continuing investigation. He was once evicted from his apartment. Shortly after the book's publication, O'Neill told an interviewer that approximately three quarters of his earnings from Little, Brown went directly to Penguin. However, he credited Amazon's purchase of the film rights with affording him some financial security.

== Contents ==
In a prologue, O'Neill recalls a heated debate with Manson prosecutor Vincent Bugliosi, who objected to O'Neill's conclusions. In the opening chapters, O'Neill recalls his initial assignment to write an article on the murders and goes on to recount the facts of the case.

O'Neill details Manson's music industry contacts: rock star Dennis Wilson, talent scout Gregg Jakobson, and producer Terry Melcher. Drawing upon records in Bugliosi's notes, O'Neill speculates that Melcher might have visited Manson after the murders; Melcher and Bugliosi both denied the claim.

O'Neill argues that Bobby Beausoleil made a call to Spahn Ranch shortly after his arrest and that LA Sheriffs destroyed a tape of this call after the murders. O'Neill argues that Reeve Whitson may have been at the Tate crime scene before police arrives; O'Neill speculates that Whitson was linked to the CIA.

O'Neill details how the August 16 raid of Spahn Ranch resulted in the arrest of Manson and his followers, only for them to be freed days later. According to Bugliosi's book, the release was because the search warrant had been misdated. O'Neill quotes sources who dispute that explanation and speculate the release might have been a sign that the prisoners were confidential informants or otherwise useful to authorities.

O'Neill writes that Manson had a long history of leniency from the authorities. Manson had been paroled from federal prison against his own wishes and remained free despite committing numerous acts that could have violated his parole. O'Neill discuses parole officer Roger Smith, who worked at the Haight Ashbury Free Medical Clinic (HAFMC). Manson met with his parole officer at the clinic and his "family" were frequent patients.

O'Neill notes that during the 1966–1967 academic year, psychiatrist and CIA consultant Louis Jolyon "Jolly" West had "led a group of researchers to San Francisco's Haight-Ashbury district, where they rented an apartment and studied the hippie culture". While admitting there is no direct evidence linking Manson and West, O'Neill muses about a possible connection between the two.

== Reception ==
Publishers Weekly wrote that "True crime fans will be enthralled." The Guardian's Peter Conrad wrote, "As [O'Neill] admits, the loose ends are still not tied up and with so many of the culprits dead they probably never will be. O'Neill's intricately sinister 'secret history' often sounds incredible; that doesn't mean that it's not all true." Writing in the Los Angeles Times, Stephen Phillips deemed that O'Neill did "yeoman's work filling out an aging narrative straitjacketed by the exigencies of its author's legal strategy." Writing for Library Journal, Bart Everts claimed the authors "make a convincing argument that there is much more to this case than Bugliosi and Gentry's narrative presents." Greg King of The Washington Post wrote, "There's plenty of new information that makes CHAOS a worthwhile addition to the canon of Manson literature, even if it ends without a unified theory of the crimes and their motivations."

In a mixed review, Kirkus Reviews called the book "overlong", praising "the author's confessions of the many dead ends and blank spots he encountered", but largely criticized O'Neill for exploring too many theories. Tony Allen-Mills of The Sunday Times felt that the early chapters of the book "do a convincing job picking out the flaws in Bugliosi's case, but the wheels start to come off when O'Neill begins searching for alternative explanations."

== Film adaptation ==
On July 19, 2019, Variety reported that Amazon Studios purchased the film rights to the book. Before CHAOS was published, an adaptation of O'Neill's story was originally in development by Errol Morris in collaboration with Netflix, but O'Neill backed out of the project over creative differences. However, in December 2023, Morris revealed that he would begin production on an adaptation of O'Neill's book for Netflix after completing his next film. The film was released by Netflix on March 7, 2025.
