= Whitney Dylan =

American actress

- Born: August 16, 1976 (age 49); Memphis, Tennessee, U.S.
- Occupation: Actress
- Years active: 1999–present

Whitney Dylan (born in Memphis, Tennessee on August 16, 1976) is an American actress.

== Life and career ==
Whitney Dylan was born on August 16, 1976, in Memphis, Tennessee.

Her first on-screen appearance was a role as Lysette in the episode "The Zeppo" of The WB's horror television series Buffy the Vampire Slayer. Dylan had guest roles in television series Ryan Caulfield: Year One, ER, Angel, Special Unit 2, Charmed, Judging Amy and Desperate Housewives. Her film credits include Coyote Ugly (2000) and The Island (2005). She portrayed Sharon Tate in the television film Helter Skelter (2004).

== Filmography ==
Film roles
Year	Title	Role	Notes
2000	Coyote Ugly	Fiji Mermaid Worker	
2000	Downward Angel	Julie	
2002	Malevolent	Julie	Uncredited
2003	Descendant	Lisa	
2004	Jumbo Girl	Linda	Short film
2005	Extreme Dating	Vicki	
2005	The Island	Client Services Operator	
2011	L.A.dy Dior	Britanya	Short film

Television roles
Year	Title	Role	Notes
1999	Buffy the Vampire Slayer	Lysette	Episode: "The Zeppo"
1999	Ryan Caulfield: Year One	Debbi	Episode: "Nocturnal Radius"
2000	Alien Fury: Countdown to Invasion	Kendra Van Dillion	Television film
2001	ER	Laura Becton	Episode: "Survival of the Fittest"
2001	Special Unit 2	Shandi	Episode: "The Web"
2001	Angel	Marelda	Episode: "There's No Place Like Plrtz Glrb"
2001	Men, Women & Dogs	Debbie	Episode: "The Magic Three-Legged Sex Dog"
2001	Charmed	Wendy	Episode: "Brain Drain"
2002	Off Centre	Kelly	Episode: "The Gas Crisis"
2002	Philly	Cindy 'Cory' Morris	Episode: "Here Comes the Judge"
2003	Judging Amy	Imbecile's Date	Episode: "Just Say Oops"
2004	Helter skelter	Sharon Tate	Television film
2005	Inconceivable	Tonja	Episode: "The Last Straw"
2006	Modern Men	Cynthia	Episode: "Pilot"
2006	Desperate Housewives	Kelli	Episode: "It Wasn't Meant to Happen"
2014	Firsts	Melissa	Episode: "First I Do", "First Threesome"
2016	Pitch	June Grissom	Episode: "San Francisco"
