= Helter Skelter (1976 film) =

1976 American television film by Tom Gries

- DVD cover of Helter Skelter
- Genre: True crime Crime; Drama; Thriller
- Based on: Helter Skelter by Vincent Bugliosi; Curt Gentry
- Screenplay by: JP Miller
- Directed by: Tom Gries
- Starring: George DiCenzo; Steve Railsback; Nancy Wolfe; Marilyn Burns; Christina Hart; Cathey Paine; Alan Oppenheimer; Read Morgan; Sondra Blake
- Theme music composer: Billy Goldenberg
- Country of origin: United States
- Original language: English
- No. of episodes: 2

Production
- Producers: Philip Capice; Lee Rich
- Cinematography: Jules Brenner
- Editors: Byron "Buzz" Brandt; Bud S. Isaacs
- Running time: 184 minutes
- Production company: Lorimar Television

Original release
- Network: CBS
- Release: April 1 – April 2, 1976

Helter Skelter is a 1976 American true crime drama thriller television film based on the 1974 book by prosecutor Vincent Bugliosi and Curt Gentry. In the United States, it aired over two nights. In some countries it was shown in cinemas, with additional footage including nudity, profanity, and more violence.

The movie is based on the murders committed by the Charles Manson Family. The best-known victim was pregnant actress Sharon Tate. The title was taken from the 1968 Beatles' song of the same name. According to the theory put forward by the prosecution, Manson used the term for an anticipated race war, and "healter skelter" [sic] was scrawled in blood on the refrigerator door at the home of victims Rosemary and Leno LaBianca. It recounts the murders Manson committed, the investigation, and the 1970-71 trial, in which prosecutor Vincent Bugliosi attempted to draw connections between the Manson family and his violent convictions.

The 1976 film, directed by Tom Gries, stars Steve Railsback as Manson and George DiCenzo as Bugliosi. Writer JP Miller received a 1977 Edgar Award from the Mystery Writers of America for Best TV Feature or Mini-series Teleplay.

In 2004, the book was adapted for a second made-for-TV movie, written and directed by John Gray and featuring Jeremy Davies as Manson.

== Plot ==
William Garretson is arrested following the discovery of the bodies of Sharon Tate and her guests at her home but is released three days later for lack of evidence. The police are unwilling to connect the Tate killings to the Hinman murder and LaBianca killings, despite the similarities of the crime scenes including writing in blood on the walls, and instead pursue a drug-related angle for the Tate killings.

The police raid Spahn Ranch in an attempt to break up an auto theft ring and arrest Manson and his gang. Nine-year-old "Steven Quint" (based on 10-year-old Steven Weiss) discovers a gun and his father turns it over to the police, where it is ignored. The Manson Family is released from prison and later two girls fleeing from Death Valley, "Stephanie Mark" (based on Stephanie Schram) and Kitty Lutesinger, tell police that the Manson Family has moved to Barker Ranch and that Susan Atkins was involved in the Hinman murder. Susan is arrested and reveals to her fellow inmate Ronnie Howard that she also killed Sharon Tate and was involved in eleven other killings.

Los Angeles District Attorney Vincent Bugliosi interviews Danny DeCarlo, who gives a tour of Spahn Ranch and says that Manson had a .22 caliber Buntline revolver matching that used in the murders. Ronnie Howard calls the homicide division and tells them what Susan confessed to her. Bugliosi requests bail to be set high for Manson's trial for burning municipal earthmoving equipment in order to give him time to get evidence for the grand jury for the murders.

Bugliosi interviews the Manson Girls and obtains arrest warrants for participants in the killings. Linda Kasabian turns herself in on the warrant while the fingerprints of Tex Watson and Patricia Krenwinkel are matched to those found at the Tate residence. During the grand jury proceedings, Susan gives all of the details of the Tate and LaBianca killings. As a result, Susan, Leslie Van Houten, Tex, Patricia, Linda, and Manson are all brought up on charges.

A reporter and photographer from KABC-TV, Los Angeles who are attempting to retrace the events of the crime as reported in the newspaper, discover where the bloody clothes from the murders have been discarded. Steven's father calls to ask about the .22 revolver, but the police tell him that they don't have time for him and hang up on him. He tells the story to the news in order to embarrass the investigators. Bugliosi uses ballistics testing to link the gun to the one used on victim Jay Sebring.

Manson chooses to represent himself at trial and Bugliosi tricks Manson into requesting more time, thus also giving himself more time to put a stronger case together. Bugliosi interviews former Manson Family member Paul Watkins, who explains Manson's views that the Beatles are sending him messages to spark a race war dubbed "Helter Skelter".

During the trial, testimony is heard from Linda Kasabian regarding the Tate and LaBianca murders despite repeated objections from the counsel for the defense. At one point Manson leaps at the judge but is subdued. He demands to give testimony, much of which works to his disadvantage. Due to their continuous disruptions, the defendants are ordered out of the courtroom during the closing arguments. Ultimately all of the defendants are sentenced to death but California later eliminates the death penalty in 1972, making the convicts eligible to apply for parole in the future.

== Cast ==
- George DiCenzo as Vincent Bugliosi
- Steve Railsback as Charles Manson
- Nancy Wolfe as Susan Atkins
- Marilyn Burns as Linda Kasabian
- Christina Hart as Patricia Krenwinkel
- Cathey Paine as Leslie Van Houten
- Bill Durkin as Charles “Tex” Watson
- Alan Oppenheimer as Aaron Stovitz
- Sondra Blake as Ronnie Howard
- Rudy Ramos as Danny DeCarlo
- Jon Gries as William Garretson
- Skip Homeier as Judge Charles H. Older
- Linden Chiles as J. Miller Leavy
- Marc Alaimo as Phil Cohen
- Paul Mantee as Sergeant O'Neal
- David Clennon as Harry Jones
- Eileen Dietz as Family Girl
- Carole Ita White as "Big Sal"
- Larry Pennell as Sergeant White
- Bruce French as Officer Ocher
- Howard Caine as Everett Scoville
- Adam Williams as Terrence Milik
- Jonathan Goldsmith as Hank Charter
- Robert Ito as Drees Darrin
- Bart Braverman as George Brewer
- Ray Middleton as George Spahn

== Broadcast history ==
The first part of the film premiered on CBS on Thursday, April 1, 1976 with a Nielsen rating of 35.2 and an audience share of 57%, making it the most watched made-for-TV movie ever, surpassing 1972's The Night Stalker. The concluding part aired the following night and had an even better rating of 37.5 and an audience share of 60%.

The average household share of 36.5 was eclipsed the following year by Little Ladies of the Night but the 37.5 rating for the concluding part was not eclipsed by a made-for-TV movie until 1983's The Day After which, as of 2023, still holds the record for the most-watched made for television film.

At the time of its broadcast, the average household share made it the eleventh-highest-rated movie to air on network television, and as of 2003 it ranked 16th.

== Reception ==
On review aggregator Rotten Tomatoes, the film holds an approval rating of 100% based on 11 reviews, with a weighted average rating of 7.3/10.

== Awards and nominations ==
=== 1977 Emmy Awards ===
- Nominated, Outstanding Achievement in Music Composition for a Special (Dramatic Underscore) – Billy Goldenberg
- Nominated, Outstanding Directing in a Special Program - Drama or Comedy – Tom Gries
- Nominated, Outstanding Film Editing for a Special – Byron Brandt, Bud S. Isaacs

=== Edgar Allan Poe Awards ===
- Won, Best Television Feature or Miniseries – J.P. Miller
