= Linda Kasabian =

Member of the Manson Family (1949–2023)

- Born: Linda Darlene Drouin; June 21, 1949; Biddeford, Maine, U.S.
- Died: January 21, 2023 (aged 73); Tacoma, Washington, U.S.
- Other names: Linda Darlene Drouin; Linda Christian; Linda Chiochios
- Known for: Association with the Manson Family and as a prosecution witness in the Tate–LaBianca murder trials
- Children: 4

Linda Darlene Kasabian (née Drouin; June 21, 1949 – January 21, 2023) was an American woman known for being a member of the Manson Family, a cult led by Charles Manson in late-1960s–early-1970s California. She was present at both of the Tate–LaBianca murders committed by the cult members in 1969, but received legal immunity for her testimony as a key witness in District Attorney Vincent Bugliosi's prosecution of Manson and his followers.

== Early life ==
Linda Darlene Drouin was born in Biddeford, Maine, on June 21, 1949, and raised in the New England town of Milford, New Hampshire. Her father, Rosaire Drouin, was a construction worker of French-Canadian ancestry. Her mother, Joyce Taylor, was a homemaker. They struggled financially in a working-class home. Her parents often did not get along, and her father eventually left when she was still a young child. Both of her parents remarried a short time later, and her father moved to Miami, Florida. She was the eldest child, and her mother Joyce has remarked that with so many younger children and stepchildren to care for, she was not able to devote the necessary attention to her teenage daughter. "I didn't have time to listen to her problems. A lot of what has happened to Linda is my fault", she has admitted.

As a child, Kasabian was described by friends, neighbors, and teachers as intelligent, a good student but a "starry-eyed romantic". She was regarded as kind and shy but "forced to grow up too soon". She dropped out of high school and ran away from home at the age of sixteen due to conflict with her stepfather, Jake Byrd, who she claimed mistreated both her and her mother. Kasabian traveled to the West Coast, "looking for God". At the age of 16, she married Robert Peaslee, a high school classmate, but divorced a short time later. She briefly moved to Miami and tried to reconnect with her father, who was working as a bartender, but they again drifted apart before long.

She then traveled to Boston, remarried, and gave birth to a daughter in 1968. When her second marriage, to Armenian American Robert Kasabian, began to sour, Linda and her baby daughter Tanya returned to New Hampshire to live with her mother. Later, Robert Kasabian contacted Linda and invited her to meet him in Los Angeles. He wanted her to join him and a friend, Charles "Blackbeard" Melton, on a sailing trip to South America. Linda, who was hoping for a reconciliation with Robert, returned to Los Angeles to live with him in Topanga Canyon.

== Introduction to the Manson Family ==
By the time she became pregnant with her second child, Kasabian was feeling neglected by her husband Robert Kasabian, who had ultimately left her behind for the South American sailing trip. Through Melton she met Catherine Share, who told Kasabian about an idyllic ranch outside Los Angeles where a commune of hippies were establishing a "hole in the earth" paradise to escape an anticipated race war which they referred to as "Helter Skelter." To Kasabian, the ranch situation sounded like the Hopi legends that she had read about as a girl, and she was intrigued. In early summer, 1969, she decided against attending a July 4 Malibu "love-in" and instead—daughter Tanya in tow—joined Share and traveled to the Spahn Ranch in the Chatsworth area outside Los Angeles, where she met Charles Manson and soon became a member of his "Family".

Kasabian was welcomed by group members, who greeted her with professions of peace and love and assurances that she and her daughter would be cared for, provided she proved loyal. Kasabian became privy to various events and statements that later proved to be important to the criminal case. During her first night with the family, she met and had sexual relations with the high-ranking Manson follower Tex Watson. Both of them have described their initial encounter as very intense. Watson persuaded Kasabian to steal a sum of money from her ex-husband's friend, Charles Melton.

Kasabian was then introduced to Manson. According to Kasabian, she thought he looked magnificent in his buckskin clothing, and that he seemed to be Christ-like. Manson talked with her about why she had come to the ranch, and after "feeling her legs", he accepted her. That night, Manson and Kasabian had sex in a Spahn Ranch cave. She thought that Manson could "see right through her" and that he was perceptive of her issues with her stepfather and her feelings of being "disposable" to the people in her life and to the world in general, as recorded in her trial testimony:

Q: "What conversation did you have with Mr. Manson while you were making love?"

A: "I don't recall the entire conversation but he told me I had a father hang-up."

Q: "Did this impress you when he said you had a father hang-up?"

A: "Very much so."

Q: "Why?"

A: "Because nobody ever said that to me, and I did have a father hang-up. I hated my stepfather."

Kasabian claimed she adopted the attitude toward Manson that the other ranch girls held: "We always wanted to do anything and everything for him." She began joining family members on their "creepy crawls", quietly sneaking into random homes in Los Angeles to steal money while the occupants slept. These and other criminal activities were the means by which the members of the Manson family supported themselves, and Kasabian was willing to participate.

== Involvement with murders ==
On August 8, 1969, Kasabian claimed Manson directed her to gather a knife, a change of clothing and her driver's license, then to accompany three other members of the Manson family, Tex Watson, Susan Atkins, and Patricia Krenwinkel and do what Watson told her to. They drove to 10050 Cielo Drive. Kasabian stated she saw Watson shoot and kill Steven Parent, a teenager who had come to visit the caretaker, William Garettson. Watson then ordered Kasabian to remain outside the residence, and she stood by the car while Watson, Atkins, and Krenwinkel entered the house and killed Jay Sebring, Wojciech Frykowski, Abigail Folger, and the eight-months pregnant Sharon Tate.

Kasabian testified that at one point she heard the "horrible screams" of the victims and left the car. "I started to run toward the house, I wanted them to stop. I knew what they had done to that man [Parent], that they were killing these people. I wanted them to stop." Approaching the house from the driveway, Kasabian was met by Frykowski, who was running out the front door. Kasabian said in her testimony, "There was a man just coming out of the door and he had blood all over his face and he was standing by a post, and we looked into each other's eyes for a minute, and I said, 'Oh, God, I am so sorry. Please make it stop.' But then he just fell to the ground into the bushes." Then Watson repeatedly stabbed Frykowski and hit him in the head with a gun butt. Kasabian tried to stop the murderers by claiming that she heard "people coming" onto the Tate property, but Atkins insisted that it was "too late". According to Watson and Atkins, Kasabian stood rooted to the front lawn, watching with a horrified expression as her companions committed murder. Kasabian testified that, while in a state of shock, she ran toward the car, started it up, and considered driving away to get help, but then became concerned for her daughter back at the Spahn Ranch.

The next night, Manson, Leslie Van Houten, and Clem Grogan joined the quartet because, according to Kasabian, Manson felt the deed the night before had been performed sloppily. They drove to the LaBianca residence. Inside, Watson, Krenwinkel, and Van Houten murdered Leno and Rosemary LaBianca. When asked why she went out with the group again, knowing this time that murders would occur, Kasabian claimed that when Manson asked her to go with them she was "afraid to say no."

== Witness for the prosecution ==
Several members of the family were arrested following a raid on the Spahn Ranch in October for car theft. The police were not aware at that time that those whom they were arresting for auto theft were the murderers of Sharon Tate and Leno and Rosemary LaBianca. The investigations of these were already in progress, along with the intensive news media coverage of the murders. After being informed that a warrant for her arrest had been issued, Kasabian turned herself in to New Hampshire authorities in early December. Kasabian was offered immunity from prosecution in exchange for turning state's evidence.

There have been reports that Kasabian wanted to tell her story to the prosecutors, with or without any kind of deal, to "get it out of my head", as chief prosecutor Vincent Bugliosi described it, but that her attorney, Gary Fleischman, insisted that she remain silent until the district attorney made an offer of immunity. Kasabian, who was then pregnant with her second child, agreed to the immunity offer.

Kasabian had been an accomplice to the murders (their driver and lookout), and had not prevented the crimes or contacted the police or the sheriff afterwards. At the same time she had not entered either residence, nor was she thought to have physically participated in any of the murders. She had been described as reluctant and extremely upset during the events of both nights, even challenging Manson ("Charlie, I am not you, I cannot kill anybody."), and was the only member of the group to express remorse and sympathy for the victims. When taken back to the Tate residence to help reconstruct the crime there, Kasabian reportedly suffered an emotional breakdown.

Taking the witness stand, Kasabian was the chief witness for the prosecution, and she tearfully recounted the murders in vivid detail. She related to the trial jury all that she had seen and heard during her stay with the Manson family and during the commission of the murders. Her testimony was considered to be the most dramatic segment of the very long trial, and it received an unprecedented amount of news media coverage. During the trial, unjailed members of the Manson family led a campaign of intimidation against Kasabian in an effort to prevent her from testifying. The actual defendants in the crime constantly disrupted her testimony with a blizzard of dramatic courtroom theatrics. Manson ran a finger across his throat, glaring at Kasabian as she testified, an act he repeated during the testimony of other prosecution witnesses.

Susan Atkins also repeatedly whispered to Kasabian across the courtroom, "You're killing us!" to which Kasabian responded, "I am not killing you, you have killed yourselves." Manson notoriously interrupted Kasabian's testimony by holding up a copy of the Los Angeles Times newspaper to the jury with the headline "Manson Guilty, Nixon Declares" referring to President Richard Nixon's statements to the press about the pre-verdict trial. He apparently hoped that this stunt would result in a mistrial, which the defense argued for but lost.

During Kasabian's cross-examination, Manson's defense lawyer Irving Kanarek showed her large color crime-scene photographs of the Tate murders. Kasabian's emotional reaction was in stark contrast to the other Family members. Manson and Krenwinkel's defense attorney Paul Fitzgerald later asserted that Kanarek's tactic—meant to discredit Kasabian—was a grave error that completely backfired and exonerated the state's primary witness. Composing herself enough to look up from the color photo of the dead, bloodied Sharon Tate, Kasabian shot a look across the courtroom to the defendants. "How could you do that?" she asked. The female defendants laughed. Manson's defense attorney Kanarek asked Kasabian how she could be so certain, considering her LSD use, that she had not participated in the gruesome act. "Because I don't have that kind of thing in me, to do something so animalistic", she replied.

Although the Manson Family murder trials lasted nine months, with testimony from numerous witnesses (including several other former Family members), Kasabian's testimony more than anything else, according to Bugliosi, led to the convictions of Manson, Watson, Atkins, Krenwinkel, and Van Houten.

=== Penalty phase ===
On January 25, 1971, the defendants were found guilty on all counts by the jury, leading to the penalty phase of the trial, which decided the punishments of the convicted. Various female witnesses, including the defendants and other loyal Family members (all of whom carved bloody Xs into their foreheads as a sign of their allegiance to Manson), testified that Kasabian, rather than Manson, had masterminded the crimes. The trial jury completely rejected their testimony. Over the years, these accusations have been publicly repudiated by many of the former Family members who originally offered the tale, including Catherine Share (in 1997), Susan Atkins (in 1977), and particularly Tex Watson, who in 1978 described those allegations as "patently ridiculous."

== Life after trial ==
The news media coverage of the Manson trial had made Linda Kasabian a well-known figure by the time the sentences had been handed down, with opinions about her ranging from sympathetic to hostile. Kasabian shortly returned to New Hampshire with her husband and her children, seeking to escape the glare of the media and raise her children quietly. She lived on a commune of hippies for a time and later worked as a cook. Kasabian was called back to Los Angeles County several times after the first trial: she was a witness against Tex Watson in his separate trial in 1971 and also against Leslie Van Houten in her two retrials in 1977.

Kasabian was later detained for numerous traffic violations until an automobile accident left her partially disabled. Though she had severed all of her ties with the Manson family, the Secret Service kept her under surveillance for a time after Lynette "Squeaky" Fromme, another former Manson associate, attempted to assassinate U.S. President Gerald Ford in 1975. Kasabian was the target of scorn from the few remaining Family members.

Over the years, Kasabian avoided and refused most news media attention. Her only appearance between 1969 and 2008 was an interview with the syndicated American television program A Current Affair in 1988.

Later, Cineflix, a production company in the United Kingdom and Canada, produced a docu-drama called Manson, in which Kasabian appeared, telling her story in complete detail for the first time. This program was broadcast in the UK on August 10, 2009, and also in the United States on September 7, 2009, and again on July 20, 2013, on the History Channel. In this interview, Kasabian recounts her four weeks spent with the Manson family.

In a September 2, 2009, live interview on CNN's Larry King Live, Kasabian recounted her memories of the murders at Sharon Tate's home. To help her maintain her now-quiet life, Kasabian wore a disguise provided by the program. She told Larry King during the interview that after the trial she had been in need of, but had never obtained, "psychological counseling" and that during the previous 12 years, she had been "on a path of healing and rehabilitation". When asked about the degree of remorse she felt for her participation in the crimes, Kasabian said she felt as though she took on all the guilt that "no one else [who was involved in the crimes] felt guilt for."

From the late 1980s, Kasabian lived in the Tacoma, Washington area, using the last name "Chiochios". In a 2016 Rolling Stone article on the current status of Manson Family members still living, it was said she had been "living in near-poverty". In his 2016 book Sharon Tate and the Manson Murders, author Greg King recounted an October 1996 police raid by the Tacoma, Washington police department where Kasabian and her daughter, Quanu, had been arrested after "rock cocaine and a large bundle of cash in a dresser drawer" were discovered along with a semi-automatic handgun and ammunition. According to King, Kasabian's daughter was tried and found guilty of possession of controlled substances and sentenced to serve time in a Washington state prison.

Kasabian died in Tacoma on January 21, 2023, at the age of 73.

== Bibliography ==
- Atkins, Susan; Slosser, Bob (1977). Child of Satan, Child of God. Plainfield, New Jersey: Logos International. ISBN 0-88270-276-9. OCLC 3394770.
- Didion, Joan (1979). The White Album. New York: Simon & Schuster. ISBN 978-0671226855.
- Gilmore, John; Kenna, Ron (2000). Manson: The Unholy Trail of Charlie and the Family. Los Angeles: Amok Books. ISBN 1-878923-13-7. OCLC 49728589.
- King, Greg. Sharon Tate and The Manson Murders. Barricade Books. Fort Lee NJ, 2000. ISBN 978-1-56980-157-4.
- Sanders, Ed (2002). The Family. New York: Thunder's Mouth Press. ISBN 1-56025-396-7. OCLC 49519230.
- Paul Watkins with Guillermo Soledad. My Life with Charles Manson. Bantam, 1979. ISBN 0-553-12788-8.
- Watson, Charles as told to Ray Hoekstra. Will You Die for Me? Cross Roads Publications, 1978. Chapter 13. ISBN 0-8007-0912-8.
- "Testimony of Linda Kasabian in the Charles Manson Trial". Famous Trials: The Trial of Charles Manson, 1970–71. Archived from the original on September 16, 2008.
