= Helter Skelter (scenario) =

Theory in the Manson Family trial

The Helter Skelter scenario is an apocalyptic vision that was supposedly embraced by Charles Manson and members of his Family. At the trial of Manson and three others for the Tate–LaBianca murders, the prosecution presented it as motivating the crimes and as an aspect of the case for conspiracy. Via interviews and autobiographies, former Family members related what they had witnessed and experienced of it.

In both the trial and his subsequent (1974) book, Helter Skelter: The True Story of the Manson Murders, prosecutor Vincent Bugliosi presented evidence that, in a period that preceded the murders, Manson prophesied what he called Helter Skelter, an apocalyptic war that would arise from racial tensions between black and white people. The prophecy involved reference to the New Testament's Book of Revelation and to the Beatles' music, particularly their 1968 self-titled album, whose song "Helter Skelter" inspired its title.

A major part of the evidence was the testimony of Paul Watkins, a Family member uninvolved in the crimes, who presented the vision in full form. Though the defendants were convicted on all charges of conspiracy and murder, various parties have argued for other motives of the murders. Writers, police detectives, attorneys involved with the case, and perpetrators have contended that the crimes were copycat killings, revenge for a bad drug deal, or a combination thereof.

== Background ==
As assembled by Bugliosi, the evidence of the vision indicated that Manson had been predicting racial conflict for some time before he used the term "Helter Skelter". According to Paul Watkins, he first used the term at a gathering of the Family on New Year's Eve 1968 at Myers Ranch, near California's Death Valley. The apocalyptic scenario had Manson as the war's ultimate beneficiary and its musical cause. With the Family, Manson would create an album whose songs would bear messages as subtle as those he had heard in songs of the Beatles. These would draw the "love"—the hippies in Haight-Ashbury—to join the Family.

In the vision's logic, black men would thus be deprived of the white women whom the political changes of the 1960s had made sexually available to them; they would lash out in violent crimes against whites. Manson, according to Family member Brooks Poston, "said a group of real blacks would come out of the ghettos and do an atrocious crime in the richer sections of Los Angeles and other cities. They would do an atrocious murder with stabbing, killing, cutting bodies to pieces, smearing blood on the walls, writing 'pigs' on the walls ... in the victims' own blood."

When frightened whites, according to Watkins and Tex Watson, would retaliate with a murderous rampage, militant blacks would exploit it to provoke a war of near-extermination between racist and non-racist whites over the treatment of blacks. In the wake of that, black militants would arise to finish off the few white survivors and to kill off all non-blacks.

In this holocaust, according to Watkins, the members of the enlarged Family would have little to fear; they would wait out the war in a secret city underneath Death Valley, a city they'd reach through a hole in the ground. Upon the war's conclusion, they would be the only remaining whites. Emerging from underground, they would rule the blacks, who, having "completed the white man's karma", would want no longer to kill. Proving, as Watkins explained, incapable of running the world, blacks would go to Manson, who'd "scratch [the black man's] fuzzy head and kick him in the butt and tell him to go pick the cotton and go be a good nigger."

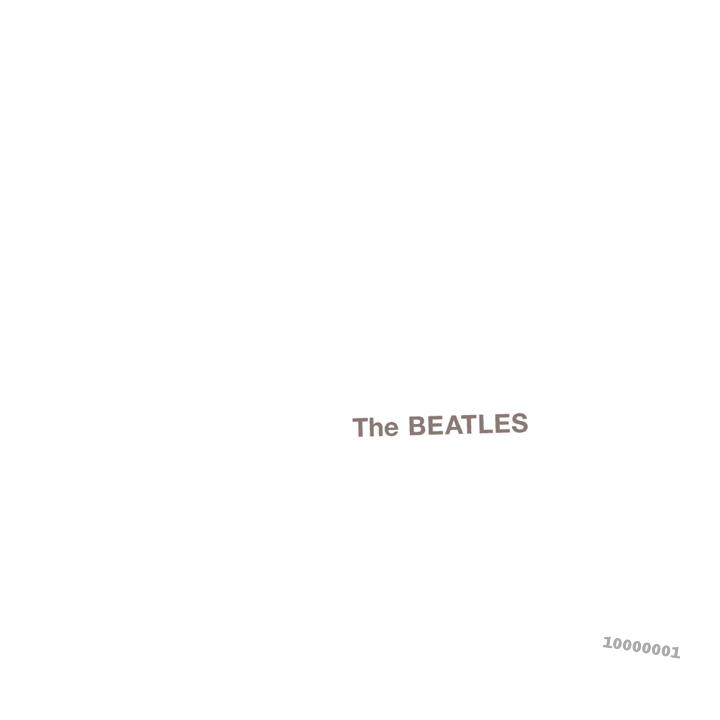
Manson listened to the Beatles' 1968 album, which includes the track "Helter Skelter".

The term "Helter Skelter" was taken from the Beatles' song of the same name, which Manson reportedly interpreted as concerned with the war. The song was on the band's self-titled double album, also known as the "White Album", which Manson heard within a month or so of its November 1968 release.

Appearing in a 2009 documentary, former Manson follower Catherine Share said the following:

When the Beatles' White Album came out, Charlie listened to it over and over and over and over again. He was quite certain that the Beatles had tapped in to his spirit, the truth—that everything was gonna come down and the black man was going to rise. It wasn't that Charlie listened to the White Album and started following what he thought the Beatles were saying. It was the other way around. He thought that the Beatles were talking about what he had been expounding for years. Every single song on the White Album, he felt that they were singing about us. The song 'Helter Skelter'—he was interpreting that to mean the blacks were gonna go up and the whites were gonna go down.

According to Paul Watkins, Manson and his followers began preparing for Helter Skelter in the months before they committed the murders. They worked on songs for the hoped-for album, which they anticipated would set off everything. They prepared vehicles and other items for escape from their Los Angeles base to Death Valley when the days of violence would arrive. They pored over maps to plot a route that would bypass highways and get them to the desert safely. Manson, according to Tex Watson, "used ... parts of the song ['Helter Skelter'] to plot out [the] escape route to the desert."

=== Tate–LaBianca murders ===
On the night of August 9–10, 1969, Manson, Linda Kasabian, Steve Grogan, Susan Atkins, Leslie Van Houten, and Patricia Krenwinkel drove to the Los Angeles home of Leno and Rosemary LaBianca, who were murdered. In trial testimony, an interview with the Los Angeles Times, or in an autobiography, Linda Kasabian, Susan Atkins, and Tex Watson stated that Manson guided the group to the home, directed the tying-up of the LaBiancas or said he had tied them up, or gave instruction as to the killings. In Leno LaBianca's blood, Krenwinkel wrote "Healter [sic] Skelter" on the refrigerator and "Rise" and "Death to Pigs" on walls.

On the previous night, August 8–9, Tex Watson, Linda Kasabian, Susan Atkins, and Patricia Krenwinkel had driven to 10050 Cielo Drive, in Beverly Hills, where pregnant actress Sharon Tate and four other persons were murdered. In trial testimony, an interview with the Los Angeles Times, or autobiography, Linda Kasabian, Susan Atkins, and Tex Watson stated that Manson assembled the group, whom he instructed to get weapons and changes of clothes; gave an instruction to "Go with Tex and do whatever Tex tells you to do"; and/or instructed Watson to go to the house and kill everyone in it. Using Tate's blood, Atkins wrote "Pig" on the door.

Earlier that day, Kasabian would testify, Manson told the Family, "Now is the time for Helter Skelter." Upon the group's return from the Tate–Polanski residence, stated Watson, in his autobiography, Manson asked him, "Was it really Helter Skelter?" Replied Watson, "Yeah, it was sure Helter Skelter."

On October 12, 1969, during the arrests that led to the charges in the murders, California Highway Patrol officer James Pursell found Manson at Barker Ranch. According to Pursell, "Charlie told us that his group was out there looking for a place to hide because there was an impending race war. He told us that the blacks were going to win. He told us that because we were number one, cops, and number two, white, we should stop right there, let them loose, and flee for our lives."

In early 1969, Paul Watkins told Bugliosi, Manson had told him Helter Skelter would start that summer. In May or June, months after he had been frustrated in his efforts to make the album, he told Watkins Helter Skelter was "ready to happen". "Blackie never did anything without whitey showin' him how", Watkins would recount Manson's saying. "Helter Skelter is coming down. But it looks like we're gonna have to show blackie how to do it."

== References to the Beatles and the Book of Revelation ==
In his book Helter Skelter, Bugliosi writes that Manson told "numerous people", including former Barker gang member Alvin Karpis, that "given the chance, he could be much bigger than the Beatles."

In My Life with Charles Manson, Watkins said Manson delivered the Helter Skelter prophecy around a campfire at Myers Ranch. As Family members listened to the album repeatedly over the following days, they believed it:

At that point Charlie's credibility seemed indisputable. For weeks he had been talking of revolution, prophesying it. We had listened to him rap; we were geared for it—making music to program the young love. Then, from across the Atlantic, the hottest music group in the world substantiates Charlie with an album which is almost blood-curdling in its depiction of violence. It was uncanny.

Watkins said, too, that Manson "spent hours quoting and interpreting Revelation to the Family, particularly verses from chapter 9".

Watson wrote that the Bible had "absolutely no meaning in our life in the Family" apart from Revelation chapter 9. Manson lived with an aunt and uncle for a period in his childhood when his mother was in prison. He later told a counselor that the aunt and uncle had "some marital difficulty until they became interested in religion and became very extreme".

=== Beatles songs, as interpreted in the vision ===
The following summarizes Bugliosi's account of statements made to him by Family members Paul Watkins and Brooks Poston and talent scout Gregg Jakobson. It also includes statements from Tex Watson's autobiography, published years after the Tate–LaBianca murders, and statements of Manson himself to David Dalton.

- "Honey Pie"
  - Lyric: Oh, honey pie, my position is tragic / Come and show me the magic / Of your Hollywood song
    - Meaning: The Beatles know Jesus Christ has returned to Earth and is in Los Angeles. They want Manson to create his "song", that is, his album that will set off Helter Skelter.
  - Lyric: Oh, honey pie, you are driving me frantic / Sail across the Atlantic / To be where you belong
    - Meaning: The Beatles want Jesus Christ to come to England.
    - Consequence: In early 1969, states Bugliosi in Helter Skelter, Manson and his female followers attempt to contact the Beatles by letter, telegram, and telephone; they are struggling to make clear to the Beatles that it is they, the Beatles, who are to come across the Atlantic, to join the family in Death Valley.
- "I Will", "Yer Blues", "Don't Pass Me By" and "Blue Jay Way" were all interpreted as the Beatles are calling for Jesus Christ.
  - "Blue Jay Way" appeared on Magical Mystery Tour, the album that preceded The Beatles. The Family had come to call its journey from San Francisco, to Los Angeles, the "Magical Mystery Tour".
  - Lyric (I Will): And when at last I find you / Your song will fill the air / Sing it loud so I can hear you / Make it easy to be near you ...
    - Meaning: The Beatles want Manson to make an album.
- "Sexy Sadie"
  - Significance: Manson had renamed Family member Susan Atkins "Sadie Mae Glutz" long before the release of The Beatles. This served to reinforce the mental connection Manson felt he had with the Beatles.
  - In San Francisco, where she met Manson, Atkins had been a topless dancer. Paul Watkins wrote that Atkins "thrived on sex", and he even seemed to suggest she had the nickname Sexy Sadie before the Family heard the song. Similarly, Tex Watson wrote that the words of "Sexy Sadie" fit Atkins so well "that it made us all sure [the Beatles] had to be singing directly to us." Watson specifically noted that the song's title character "came along to turn on everyone", "broke the rules", and "laid it down for all to see". Atkins, he said, "had broken all the rules, sexually, and liked to talk about her experience and lack of inhibitions".
- "Rocky Raccoon"
  - Significance: Rocky Raccoon means "coon", a racial epithet for a black man.
  - Of all the Beatles songs known to have been associated with Helter Skelter, this is the only one that mentions the Bible.
    - So one day [Rocky Raccoon] walked into town / Booked himself a room in the local saloon / Rocky Raccoon / Checked into his room / Only to find Gideon's Bible ... Now Rocky Raccoon / He fell back in his room / Only to find Gideon's Bible / Gideon checked out / And he left it no doubt / To help with good Rocky's revival.
  - Before his trial, Manson was visited at the Los Angeles County Jail by David Dalton and David Felton, who were preparing a Rolling Stone story. An article in the magazine's issue of June 25, 1970, included a passage in which Manson was quoted about "Rocky Raccoon":
    - "Coon," said Charlie. "You know that's a word they use for black people. You know the line, 'Gideon checked out / And left no doubt / To help good Rocky's revival.' Rocky's revival—re-vival. It means coming back to life. The black man is going to come into power again. 'Gideon checks out' means that it's all written out there in the New Testament, in the Book of Revelations [sic].
- "Happiness Is a Warm Gun"
  - Significance: The Beatles are advising blacks to get guns and fight whites.
  - Sample lyric: When I hold you in my arms / And I feel my finger on your trigger / I know no one can do me no harm / Because happiness is a warm gun / (Bang bang, shoot shoot)
- "Blackbird"
  - Lyric: Blackbird singing in the dead of night / Take these broken wings and learn to fly / All your life / You were only waiting for this moment to arise.
    - Meaning: The black man is going to arise and overthrow the white man. The Beatles are programming blacks to rise.
  - Tex Watson wrote: "[The white Establishment] would slaughter thousands of blacks, but actually only manage to eliminate all the Uncle Toms, since the true black race would have hidden, waiting for their moment".
- "Helter Skelter"
  - Lyric: When I get to the bottom I go back to the top of the slide / Where I stop and I turn and I go for a ride
    - Significance: A reference to the Family's emergence from "the Bottomless Pit", the underground Death Valley hideaway where the group will escape the violence of Helter Skelter.
  - Lyric: Look out ... Helter Skelter ... She's coming down fast ... Yes she is.
    - Meaning: The upcoming explosion of race-based violence is imminent.
- "Piggies"
  - Lyric: What they need's a damn good whacking
    - Significance: Blacks are going to give "the piggies"—i.e., the establishment—a damned good whacking.
  - Lyric: Everywhere there's lots of piggies / Living piggy lives / You can see them out for dinner / With their piggy wives / Clutching forks and knives / To eat their bacon.
    - Bugliosi noted that Leno LaBianca was left with a knife in his throat and a fork in his stomach, details that led Bugliosi to draw a further connection with George Harrison's song.
- "Revolution 1"
  - Lyric: You say you want a revolution / Well you know / We all want to change the world ... / But when you talk about destruction / Don't you know that you can count me out (in)
    - Significance: The singing of "in" after the word "out", even though "in" does not appear in the lyrics as they were presented on the printed sheet enclosed with the album, indicates that the Beatles had been undecided but now favor revolution. The Beatles, as Tex Watson relates Manson's view, are no longer on a "peace-and-love trip", but they cannot admit as much to the establishment.
  - Lyric: You say you got a real solution / Well you know / We'd all love to see the plan
    - Meaning: The Beatles want Manson to tell them how to escape the horrors of Helter Skelter. According to Watson and as told to Bugliosi: the Beatles are ready for violence and want Manson to create an album that will tell them what to do.
- "Revolution 9"
  - According to Tex Watson this is the album piece Manson spoke about the most, the one he deemed most significant. In his 1970 conversation with Dalton, Manson said that "Revolution 9" was the track that "turned me on" to the message of Revelations chapter 9, which "predicts the overthrow of the Establishment. The pit will be opened, and that's when it will all come down. A third of all mankind will die."
    - Significance: The machine-gun fire, the oinking of pigs, and the word "Rise". The piece is audio representation of the coming conflict; the repeated utterance "Number 9" is reference to Chapter 9 of the Book of Revelation. In his Rolling Stone interview, Manson identified the pig sounds followed by machine-gun fire as significant details that "predict the violent overthrow of the White man". When asked whether the Beatles intended such a message, Manson replied: "I don't know whether they did or not. But it's there. It's an association in the subconscious. This music is bringing on the revolution, the unorganized overthrow of the Establishment. The Beatles know in the sense that the subconscious knows."
    - "Rise", Gregg Jakobson tells Bugliosi, is "one of [Manson's] big words"; the black man is going to "rise" up against the white man. According to Ed Sanders while Manson played "Revolution 9", he [screamed] "Rise! Rise! Rise!"
    - Sanders also writes that Manson heard the Beatles whispering: "Charlie, Charlie, send us a telegram."

Years later Tex Watson tied the prophecy to one more song from The Beatles, "Everybody's Got Something to Hide Except Me and My Monkey", though he changed monkey to monkeys. While on LSD at a party in late March 1969, Watson states in his autobiography, he and two Manson girls realized they themselves were "the monkeys ... just bright-eyed, free little animals, totally uninhibited," as they started "bouncing around the apartment, throwing food against the walls, and laughing hysterically".

=== Book of Revelation, as interpreted in the vision ===
- Chapter 7:
  - Verse 4: And I heard the number of them which were sealed: and there were sealed one hundred and forty and four thousand of all the tribes of the children of Israel.
    - One hundred forty-four thousand would be the membership of the Family when, in Helter Skelter's aftermath, it would emerge from "the bottomless pit" to rule.
    - Tex Watson said this growth in the Manson Family would be a result of procreation, while Paul Watkins stated that it would result from the release of the Family's album, which would draw other people to the group. Watkins also said that the Family would acquire babies made homeless in Helter Skelter. Several decades were to pass before the Family would at last depart the Bottomless Pit; the group would live there in miniaturized form.
- Chapter 9:
  - Verses 2–3: And he opened the bottomless pit.... And there came out of the smoke locusts upon the earth; and unto them was given power, as the scorpions of the earth have power.
    - locusts refers to the Beatles
    - According to Watkins, as the scorpions of the earth have power means the power of scorpion, that is, Manson, a Scorpio, will prevail
    - bottomless pit = the underground city in which the Family would ride out the ravages of Helter Skelter. The Family would be lowered into this by means of a gold rope; Manson bought gold rope at a Santa Monica sporting-goods store.
  - Verses 7–8: ... [A]nd [the locusts'] faces were as the faces of men. And they had hair as the hair of women...
    - According to Gregg Jakobson: the Beatles are men with long hair
  - Verse 17: And thus I saw the horses in the vision, and them that sat on them, having breastplates of fire, and of jacinth, and brimstone: and the heads of the horses were as the heads of lions; and out of their mouths issued fire and smoke and brimstone.
    - Breastplates of fire, according to Brooks Poston = the Beatles' electric guitars. Fire and smoke and brimstone out of their mouths, according to Gregg Jakobson = the power of the Beatles' lyrics. According to Watson, this was the power of their music to ignite Helter Skelter
  - Verse 7: And the shapes of the locusts were like unto horses prepared unto battle
    - The horses, Brooks Poston told Bugliosi, were the dune buggies the Family will be riding during Helter Skelter
    - In Manson's view, according to Watkins, dune buggies were the ideal vehicles of the apocalypse; they would enable the Family to outrun police in the Bottomless Pit and were light enough that a few of the girls could carry them. During the war, the Family would be making forays from the Bottomless Pit. They would be fitted with machine gun mounts; while the men would drive, the girls would operate the guns.
    - Fitted next to the steering wheel of Manson's personal buggy was a metal scabbard. It held a katana with which, in July 1969, Manson allegedly slashed the ear of Gary Hinman. On the buggy's front, wrote Ed Sanders, was a winch that Manson envisioned using to evade police. He would fling the winch's rope up into a tree and then winch himself up out of sight as pursuing officers would drive haplessly by.
    - Family member Catherine Share said "Charlie talked about Helter Skelter every night. ... [W]e'd learn to live off the land. We'd live in the desert and come in on dune buggies and rescue the orphaned white babies. We'd be the saviors."
  - Verse 15: And the four angels were loosed, which were prepared for an hour, and a day, and a month, and a year, for to slay the third part of men
    - The four angels, according to Gregg Jakobson, were the Beatles. In the vision, Watson would state in his autobiography, they were prophets, preparing the way for Jesus Christ, i.e., Manson, to lead the chosen people away to safety
    - slay the third part of men, according to Jakobson, meant "one third of mankind ... the white race," which would die in Helter Skelter.
  - Verse 16: And the number of the army of the horsemen were two hundred thousand thousand: and I heard the number of them.
    - two hundred thousand thousand horsemen, according to Brooks Poston referred to Straight Satans motorcycle gang-members Manson was attempting to recruit into the Family
    - The Straight Satans were to be the Family's "needed military wing". According to Watkins the bikers and the Family would cruise through Helter Skelter in the manner of a flock of birds, all turning in one direction or another without even a sound from their leader.
  - Verse 4: And it was commanded [that the locusts] should not hurt the grass of the earth, neither any green thing, neither any tree; but only those men which have not the seal of God in their foreheads.
    - not hurt the grass of the earth, neither any green thing, neither any tree meant only humans, not nature, will be destroyed in Helter Skelter according to Watkins
    - the seal of God in their foreheads, according to Gregg Jakobson = a mark that would indicate whether someone was on Manson's side or not. In Helter Skelter, those without it would perish, Watson would state, in his characterization of the vision.
  - Verse 20: And the rest of the men which were not killed by these plagues yet repented not of the works of their hands, that they should not worship devils, and idols of gold, and silver, and brass...
    - the worship of idols of gold and silver and brass, according to Gregg Jakobson = the establishment's worship of materialism and money
  - Verse 1: And the fifth angel sounded, and I saw a star fall from heaven unto the earth: and to him was given the key of the bottomless pit.
    - according to Gregg Jakobson, who arranged a recording session for Manson, the fifth angel is Stu Sutcliffe, one of the original five, not four, Beatles
    - according to Watson and Watkins, the fifth angel is Manson
- Chapter 10:
  - Verses 1 and 2: And I saw another mighty angel come down from heaven, clothed with a cloud: and a rainbow was upon his head, and his face was as it were the sun, and his feet as pillars of fire: And he had in his hand a little book open: and he set his right foot upon the sea, and his left foot on the earth...
    - For about two weeks after their departure from a house in Canoga Park, Family members moved into—or broke into—an unoccupied mansion that had recently been vacated by the rock group Iron Butterfly. In overlooking the sea from the Mulholland Hills, the house, according to Paul Watkins, met Manson's demand, in accordance with these verses, that "[the Family] have access to the sea and to the desert and that the two roads be joined."
- Chapter 21:
  - Verses 10 and 18: And [an angel] carried me away in the spirit to a great and high mountain, and showed me that great city... and the city was pure gold, like unto clear glass.
  - Verse 23: And the city had no need of the sun, neither of the moon, to shine in it
    - According to Watkins, the Family's sanctuary under Death Valley would be a city of gold where there would be no sun and no moon.
- Chapter 22:
  - Verse 2: In the midst of the street of it, and on either side of the river, was there the tree of life, which bare twelve manner of fruits, and yielded her fruit every month...
    - According to Watkins, the city underneath Death Valley would have a tree that would bear twelve different kinds of fruit, a different kind each month.

In relating how Manson would discourse in early 1969, while the Family was in the house in Canoga Park, Paul Watkins would report Manson's words as follows:

Look at [the Beatles'] songs: songs sung all over the world by the young love; it ain't nothin' new. ... It's written in... Revelation, all about the four angels programming the holocaust...the four angels looking for the fifth angel to lead the people into the pit of fire...right out to Death Valley. ... It's all in black and white, in The White Album—white, so there ain't no mistakin' the color...

In March 1969, Tex Watson, who had separated himself from the Family after Manson and he first heard The Beatles, rejoined the group. By that time, as he would recount in his autobiography, Helter Skelter had captured the group's imagination:

Although I got it in bits and pieces, some from the women and some from Manson himself, it turned out to be a remarkably complicated yet consistent thing that he [Manson] had discovered and developed in the three months we'd been apart. ... It was exciting, amazing stuff Charlie was teaching, and we'd sit around him for hours as he told us about the land of milk and honey we'd find underneath the desert and enjoy while the world above us was soaked in blood.

== Abbey Road ==
On September 26, 1969, nearly two months after the murders, the Beatles' Abbey Road was released in the United Kingdom. By that time, most of the Family was at the group's camp in the Death Valley area searching for the Bottomless Pit. Three Family members arrived at the camp around October 1 with an advance copy of the album, which the group played on a battery-operated machine.

Law officers raided the desert locations in the second week of October, found the Family with stolen vehicles, and arrested Manson and several others. By mid-November, Manson had become a suspect in the Tate–LaBianca murders, but Family members made their way back to Spahn Ranch after being released from jail. The LAPD confiscated a door on November 25 on which someone had written "Helter Scelter [sic] is coming down fast." A photograph shows that the confiscated door was also inscribed with "1, 2 3 4 5 6 7 — ALL GOOD CHILDREN (Go to Heaven?)" [sic]. This children's rhyme is heard in "You Never Give Me Your Money" on Abbey Road. In October 1970, the prosecution offered testimony about the door during Manson's trial for the Tate–LaBianca murders, but only the "Helter Skelter" inscription seems to have been noted.

Tex Watson had left the desert camp and gone on to separate himself from the Family. By his own account, he bought a cassette recording of Abbey Road and played it continuously while walking for miles across the desert, to rejoin the group; he was hoping to see what The Beatles might have to tell him. He turned back at the last moment, and an old prospector informed him that the arrests had taken place.

Three people were attacked on the beach near Santa Barbara, California in late July 1970 while Manson was on trial, two of them fatally. One of the Manson girls spoke of this incident as "Maxwell's Silver Hammer", an Abbey Road song about homicidal madness.

In an interview with her court-appointed attorney, on December 29, 1969, Leslie Van Houten cited "Come Together", the song with which Abbey Road opens: "So because Charles is the type of person he is, like he's out front with people, and a lot of people had a hard time seeing him, or looking at him. And that's another line that the Beatles set up: 'He's got to be good-looking 'cause he's so hard to see,' because so many people couldn't even look at him."

== Timeline ==
=== 1969 ===
- Around January 10: according to Paul Watkins, word comes from Manson, who is in Los Angeles, that the Family is to move from the desert to a house he found in Canoga Park. Because the canary-yellow house is a place where the Family, preparing for Helter Skelter, will be "submerged beneath the awareness of the outside world," Manson, in the account of Watkins, dubs it the Yellow Submarine, another Beatles reference.
- Mid-February: according to Watkins, while he and Manson are driving together, they see a white woman and black man holding hands. Manson tells Watkins that access to white women has pacified black men to the point that they have not yet risen up.
- March: hoping he will agree to record the music that is intended to trigger Helter Skelter, the Family vainly expects a visit from Terry Melcher, a producer for Columbia Records.
- March 23: entering uninvited upon 10050 Cielo Drive, which he has known as Melcher's residence, Manson is received by a male friend of Sharon Tate, the new lessee. Manson, who is looking for someone unknown to the friend, is told to check the guest house. After walking back to that, Manson leaves. Later in the day, Manson revisits the guest house and speaks with Rudy Altobelli, the owner of the property. Altobelli tells him Melcher no longer lives there.
- Around April 1: the Family start settling back into Spahn Ranch. During Helter Skelter, as Watson relates it, they must be at Spahn, from which they would have a "clear escape route to the desert."
- July 27: in a dispute over money, Family member Bobby Beausoleil fatally stabs Family acquaintance Gary Hinman and writes "Political piggy" on a wall in Hinman's blood.
- August 6: Beausoleil is arrested after he is caught driving Hinman's car; the knife he used to stab Hinman is found in the car's tire well.
- August 9: After midnight, Tex Watson, Susan Atkins and Patricia Krenwinkel murder Sharon Tate and four others at 10050 Cielo Drive. With Tate's blood, Atkins writes "Pig" on the house's front door. Upon the killers' return to Spahn Ranch, Manson, according to Watson, asks whether it was Helter Skelter. Watson assures him it was.
- August 10: After midnight, Tex Watson and two female Family members murder Leno and Rosemary LaBianca at their Los Feliz home. Using Leno LaBianca's blood, Patricia Krenwinkel writes "Rise" and "Death to Pigs" on the living room walls. She writes "Healter [sic] Skelter" on the refrigerator.

== Manson's testimony ==
Manson was permitted to testify at his 1970 trial for the Tate–LaBianca murders, after the defendants' attorneys had attempted to rest their cases, without calling a single witness. Because of concerns related to California's People v. Aranda (1965), having to do with a defendant's statements that might implicate co-defendants, it was decided that Manson would first testify without the jury in the courtroom.

Manson spoke for over an hour. As to Helter Skelter, he said the following:

It means confusion, literally. It doesn't mean any war with anyone. It doesn't mean that some people are going to kill other people. Helter Skelter is confusion. Confusion is coming down around you fast. If you can't see the confusion coming down around you fast, you can call it what you wish.

When Manson was asked by Bugliosi, after the testimony, whether he'd be willing to testify in the same manner in the presence of the jury, the defense objected. When the judge asked Manson if he wanted to testify in front of the jury, Manson said he had relieved all the pressure he had.

Manson has dismissed the Helter Skelter conspiracy as an invention by the trial prosecutor to tie him to the murders.

Is it a conspiracy that the music is telling the youth to rise up against the establishment because the establishment is rapidly destroying things? Is that a conspiracy? The music speaks to you every day, but you are too deaf, dumb, and blind to even listen to the music. ... It is not my conspiracy. It is not my music. I hear what it relates. It says "Rise", it says "Kill". Why blame it on me? I didn't write the music. ... As far as lining up someone for some kind of helter skelter trip, you know, that's the District Attorney's motive. That's the only thing he could find for a motive to throw up on top of all that confusion he had. There was no such thing in my mind as helter skelter.

== Statements by Van Houten ==
On December 29, 1969, Leslie Van Houten, who'd been charged with the LaBianca murders, was interviewed at Sybil Brand Institute. The interviewer was Marvin Part, who'd been appointed her attorney of record on December 19 of that year.

Van Houten said the following:

Van Houten: "You're only waiting for this moment to arise" and then "Have you seen the little piggies" ... Helter Skelter and it's "when I get to the bottom I go back to the top of the slide then I turn around and go for a ride" and "It's coming down fast, helter skelter" ...

... and then when we were reading the Bible it said about the four-headed locusts and it just described the Beatles so perfectly.

Lawyer: You say Revolutions [sic] 9. Do you read anything, any title in the Bible that you thought might have been the Beatles song Revolution 9?

Van Houten: Yeah, we looked up Revelation in the New Testament ... and it talked about a four-headed locust that would have hair of women and mouths of lions and faces of men and a shield of protective armor, and we thought it was like their guitars, because their album when we would listen ... on acid would say so much more ...

Lawyer: Did you believe that the Beatles were the four-headed locusts and ... prophets?

Van Houten [hard to hear]: Uh-huh. I believed it. ... [I]n and out of the album they've got parts of the revelations in the Bible throughout it. ... I believed that they were.

... and in one part, if you listen on another track, it sounds like they're saying 'Charlie.'

... all kinds of things that made it seem real to us, to connect the Beatles with us ...

... we started seeing that we were in this position, because we knew that we were part of the revelations in the Bible ...

... the chosen white people, would go down into the center of the earth and stay there for about fifty years and then ... something was going to happen and we were going to come back up and this was when the earth would be all black

... there would be no more white people on the earth [?]. They would all be wiped out completely.

Later, Van Houten speaks as follows:

Van Houten: ... and the next night [after the Tate murders] ... well, I was feeling bad, to tell you the truth, 'cause [Patricia Krenwinkel] was my best friend, and to think that she was strong enough in her believing [to kill], I wanted to, too, because I wanted to be just like [Krenwinkel].

So I was feeling kind of bad, 'cause I didn't get to go, and I was sure hoping that if they [?] did it again that I could go.

Lawyer: Now why in the world would you want to go out and kill somebody?

Van Houten: 'Cause it had to be done. It had to be done just in order for the whole thing to be completed. So the whole world's karma would be completed, we had to do this ...

In the penalty phase of the trial, Van Houten testified as follows:

I had a court-appointed attorney by the name of Marvin Part. He had a lot of different thoughts, which were all his own, on how to get me off. He said he was going to make some tape recordings, and he told me the gist of what he wanted me to say. And I said it.

Interviewed in 1977, by Barbara Walters, Van Houten said the following:

... and at the time, it was supposed to help people. ... The crimes, they were supposed to start a revolution that would clean the souls of everyone. And see, what Charlie would do is he would speak about people's souls and not their persons; and because we weren't tuned in enough, we couldn't see what he was talking about, so we would just have to take his word for it.

And that's what he said, that next summer there would be this big revolution and that the chosen people would live in a hole in the middle of the desert, and then after the crimes we went out and looked for the hole.
