= Jennalee Ryan =

American businesswoman (born 1957)

Jennalee Ryan (born October 25, 1957) is an entrepreneur and single mother of eight children best known for the foundation of a human embryo bank named The Abraham Center of Life.

== Biography ==
Ryan created the Abraham Center of Life, which is touted as the "first human embryo bank" and was criticized by some but applauded by others for advertising that its sperm donors all held doctorate degrees and that its egg donors were intelligent and young. It was the subject of a Food and Drug Administration investigation in 2007. The FDA closed its investigation as it was noted that the embryos were created by physicians and was legal. Jennalee Ryan announced the closure of the embryo business later that year. She closed the business in order to allow those that were better prepared to take over the path that she had created. Since opening, several American fertility companies now offer similar options.

In 2000–2001 Ryan partnered with Vincent Bugliosi to produce and co-host a made-for-television series entitled Inside the Criminal Mind, a docudrama that focused on the creation of the criminal and not the criminal act.
