= Reclaiming History =

2007 book by Vincent Bugliosi about the assassination of John F. Kennedy

Reclaiming History: The Assassination of President John F. Kennedy
- First edition of W. W. Norton & Co., 2007
- Author: Vincent Bugliosi
- Language: English
- Subject: True crime, John F. Kennedy assassination, Lee Harvey Oswald, United States conspiracies
- Publisher: W. W. Norton & Company
- Publication date: May 15, 2007
- Publication place: United States
- Media type: Print (hardcover, audio CD, Audible.com audio edition, Amazon Kindle
- Pages: 1,632 pp
- ISBN: 0-393-04525-0
- OCLC: 80180151
- Dewey Decimal: 973.922092
- LC Class: E842.9.B84 2007

Reclaiming History: The Assassination of President John F. Kennedy is a 2007 book by attorney Vincent Bugliosi that analyzes the events surrounding the assassination of United States president John F. Kennedy, focusing on the lives of Lee Harvey Oswald and Jack Ruby. He drew from many sources, including the Warren Report. Bugliosi argues that the Warren Commission's conclusion that Lee Oswald acted alone in shooting Kennedy is correct. The book won the 2008 Edgar Award for the Best Fact Crime category. Bugliosi explored the issue at length as the book totals 1,632 pages. It was published with an accompanying CD-ROM containing an additional 1,000+ pages of footnotes. He analyzed both the assassination itself and the rise of the conspiracy theories about the event in the following years.

In 2008, Bugliosi published a shorter paperback edition of this book, titled Four Days in November: The Assassination of President John F. Kennedy. It concentrated on the events of the assassination and aftermath. This version was adapted for the movie Parkland (2013). A second edition of his paperback was issued as Parkland (2013), to tie into the movie's release.

== Research ==
Bugliosi based much of the book on his preparation for a mock trial of Lee Harvey Oswald staged by British television, in which he acted as the prosecutor of Oswald. The mock trial involved an actual US judge and US citizens acting as jurors, and Oswald was defended by prominent trial lawyer Gerry Spence. Bugliosi obtained a verdict of "guilty." He wrote in the Introduction to his book:

My professional interest in the Kennedy assassination dates back to March 1986 when I was approached by a British production company, London Weekend Television (LWT) to "prosecute" Lee Harvey Oswald as the alleged assassin of President Kennedy in a proposed twenty-one hour television trial to be shown in England and several other countries, including the United States. I immediately had misgivings. Up to then, I had consistently turned down offers to appear on television in artificial courtroom settings. But when I heard more of what LWT was contemplating, my misgivings quickly dissolved. Although this could not be the real trial of Oswald...LWT, working with a large budget, had conceived and was putting together the closest thing to a real trial of Oswald that there would likely ever be, the trial in London being the only "prosecution" of Oswald ever conducted with the real witnesses in the Kennedy assassination. Through painstaking and dogged effort, LWT had managed to locate and persuade most of these original key lay witnesses, many of whom had refused to even talk to the media for years, to testify...There would be absolutely no script...and no actors would be used.

In 2007, Bugliosi told Cynthia McFadden of ABC News that in the preceding seven years, he had devoted 80 to 100 hours per week working on the book.

== Contents ==
The book is divided into several parts, including a detailed chronology of the events of the assassination, as well as an exploration of numerous conspiracy theories, a chapter on the trial of Jack Ruby, and a chapter featuring Bugliosi's interviews with Marina Oswald. Bugliosi also provides a "partial list of assassins...whom one or more conspiracy theorists have actually named and identified as having fired a weapon at Kennedy".

== Critical reception ==
In a review for The New York Times, Bryan Burrough wrote: "Bugliosi is refreshing because he doesn't just pick apart the conspiracy theorists. He ridicules them, and by name, writing that 'most of them are as kooky as a $3 bill.'" Alex Kingsbury of U.S. News & World Report described it as "the most exhaustive of the countless narratives that have been written about that fateful day in Dallas".

An extensive review in The Federal Lawyer sees merit in some aspects of the book, writing that "there is no denying that Bugliosi's herculean effort is a historic and important contribution", but observes that Bugliosi's selective approach to evidence, inaccuracies of fact, and use of slurs against critics of the Warren Commission detract from it. The reviewer observes that: "history is not being reclaimed, it is being reframed...by Bugliosi's knowingly omitting and citing material out of context. Examples similar to Bugliosi’s selective presentation of the bullet evidence abound...His incessant hurling of slurs...inevitably carries a whiff of buffoonery and anxious self-promotion about it. And that’s particularly the case when he’s flat-out wrong on the facts." The reviewer for Kirkus Reviews expresses similar sentiments, observing that while the point of Reclaiming History is to "dismantle [conspiracy] theories one by one, in sometimes tedious and overladen detail...Bugliosi does himself and his argument no favors with his tone of flippancy and dismissiveness"; nevertheless they describe the book as "oddly fascinating".

Tim Shipman of The Telegraph wrote: "Mr Bugliosi... has turned up no new killer fact. His technique instead is to expose the double-think and distortions of the conspiracy theorists." Reviewing the book's introduction and sections on Robert F. Kennedy's views of the assassination, David Talbot of Salon, wrote that "Bugliosi is a courtroom lawyer, not a historian or investigative journalist. He is clearly more interested in arguing his case than in sorting with an open mind through the piles of evidence that have been amassed over the years...Trying to claim the anti-conspiracy corner as his own, he attempts to muscle [earlier author Gerald] Posner off his turf, attacking his fellow conspiracy critic for his distortions and omissions. But Bugliosi is equally guilty of cooking the facts to make his case."

== Later editions and adaptations ==
A shorter edition of the book, titled Four Days in November: The Assassination of President John F. Kennedy, was published in paperback the following year. This version largely dispensed with much of Bugliosi's debunking of conspiracy theories, and concentrated on his narrative of the known events.

In discussing publication of this version in a 2009 interview with Patt Morrison of the Los Angeles Times, Bugliosi described Reclaiming History as his magnum opus. He said it was the work of which he was most proud. Comparing its sales to those for his 1974 bestseller Helter Skelter, he said to Morrison, "if you want to make money, you don't put out a book that weighs 7 1/2 pounds and costs $57 and has over 10,000 citations and a million and a half words."

The 2008 book was adapted for the film Parkland (2013). The title refers to Parkland Memorial Hospital, where President Kennedy, Lee Harvey Oswald and years later, Jack Ruby, were taken for treatment before their deaths. The 2008 edition was reissued and retitled in 2013 as Parkland, to tie in with the release of the film.
