= The Last Days of the Late, Great State of California =

- Cover of the 1968 Putnam edition
- Author: Curt Gentry
- Language: English
- Publisher: G.P. Putnam's Sons
- Publication date: 1968
- Dewey Decimal: 917.94035
- LC Class: F861 .G29

The Last Days of the Late, Great State of California is a novel by Curt Gentry, published in 1968 by G.P. Putnam's Sons. The novel incorporates an extensive essay on the history and culture of California from the vantage point of a future date when the state has disappeared.

== Plot synopsis ==
The novel describes, in retrospect, the history and culture of California from its earliest days, and its influence on the rest of the United States and the world when - after an unspecified date in 1969 - the state suffers a Richter magnitude 9 earthquake and the populous coastal regions west of the San Andreas Fault sink into the Pacific Ocean.

The catastrophic quake itself is covered in the penultimate chapter of the novel. The quake is described as starting on the San Andreas Fault north of Point Arena, California and continuing southward as a large rupture, until it stops near Taft, California. Pausing for moments, a second larger quake resumes, continuing southward through the Los Angeles, California area, and into the Salton Sea, where the rupture turns towards San Diego, California along a previously unknown fault line, and back into the Pacific Ocean where the quake ends. As the quake progresses, various events (both large and small scale) are described in detail. After the event, the narrative switches to "present tense" news radio and television coverage of the event using a literary convention of "changing the dial / channel" from one news report to another, to cover the disaster: The Central Valley is inundated by the sea; the Embarcadero Freeway and Coit Tower have collapsed, along with the Oakland Bay Bridge. The Golden Gate Bridge remains standing initially. Los Angeles is in ruins. As this narrative closes, two more disasters occur nearly simultaneously: The Oroville Dam bursts, and in the twilight of the day, a passenger jet over San Bernardino is pulled out of the sky by turbulence, as the pilot tries to describe the sight of the San Andreas Fault splitting open in the dusk (and, as is made clear in the final chapter, the pilot was witnessing Southern California slide into the sea).

The novel's epilogue lists what the world must now do without, due to this event, especially the large percentage of agricultural products that come from California. The bulk of the novel consists of the description of three regions: The north, The Central Valley, and the south. An account of the 1966 California governor's electoral campaign is central to the narrative.

Also discussed in detail are the 1965 Watts riots, in detail gleaned from then-recent news reports.

== Reception ==
As a result of its publication, some religious believers in the Los Angeles region decided to move away, in fear of its fictional events actually occurring. The turmoil surrounding the book's publication became known as the "Great California Earthquake Scare".

== See also ==
- Edgar Cayce, who had previously predicted the demise of California
- The Late Great Planet Earth, a 1970 non-fiction book predicting the end of the world
- Superman (1978 film) and A View to a Kill, where California's demise is a plot device
- California (1996 song) which includes the line "California's been good to me/Hope it don't fall into the sea"
