= The Betrayal of America =

2021 non-fiction book by Vincent Bugliosi

- The Betrayal of America: How the Supreme Court Undermined the Constitution and Chose our President
- Author: Vincent Bugliosi
- Language: English
- Subject: The 2000 Presidential Election
- Published: 2001
- Publisher: Nation Books
- Publication place: United States of America
- Media type: Print (hardcover)
- Pages: p.192
- ISBN: 978-1560253556

The Betrayal of America is a book by Vincent Bugliosi (Thunder's Mouth Press, 2001, ISBN 1-56025-355-X) which is largely based on an article he wrote for The Nation entitled "None Dare Call It Treason", which argues that the US Supreme Court's December 12, 2000, 5–4 decision in Bush v. Gore unlawfully handed the 2000 US presidential election to George W. Bush. Bugliosi declares that the decision damaged both the US Constitution and democracy in general. He accuses the five majority judges of moral culpability by endangering Americans' constitutional freedoms.

== See also ==
- Unprecedented: The 2000 Presidential Election – documentary featuring Bugliosi
