= Outrage: The Five Reasons Why O. J. Simpson Got Away with Murder =

1996 book by Vincent Bugliosi

Outrage
- Outrage (1996)
- Author: Vincent Bugliosi
- Language: English
- Genre: True crime
- Publisher: W. W. Norton & Company
- Publication date: 1996
- Publication place: United States
- Media type: Print (hardcover)
- Pages: 320
- ISBN: 978-0-393-04050-0

Outrage: The Five Reasons Why O. J. Simpson Got Away with Murder is a true crime book by Vincent Bugliosi published in 1996. Bugliosi sets forth five main reasons why the Los Angeles County District Attorney's office failed to successfully convict O. J. Simpson for the murders of Nicole Brown Simpson and Ronald Goldman. Personally convinced of Simpson's guilt, Bugliosi blames his acquittal on the district attorney, the judge, and especially the prosecuting attorneys Marcia Clark and Christopher Darden.

== Reviews ==
Upon its release, the book was subject to criticism from various critics. The Los Angeles Times likened Bugliosi's tone of "anger and astonishment" to a dagger as he condemned the majority of the major players in the case. The San Francisco Chronicle praised the book for its observational and authoritative tone, which followers of the case were longing for. The Globe and Mail described the book as "engagingly idiosyncratic, and occasionally self-serving and simplistic".
