= Tate–LaBianca murders =

1969 murders in Los Angeles, US

- Location: Tate murders: 10050 Cielo Drive, Los Angeles, California; LaBianca murders: 3301 Waverly Drive, Los Angeles, California, U.S.
- Date: Tate murders: August 9, 1969; LaBianca murders: August 10, 1969
- Attack type: Mass stabbing, shooting, feticide
- Weapons: .22-caliber Hi-Standard "Buntline Special" revolver; Clasp-type Buck knives; Bayonet; Two prong carving forks
- Deaths: 8 (including unborn baby at 8 ½ month pregnancy)
- Victims: Abigail Folger; Wojciech Frykowski; Steven Parent; Jay Sebring; Sharon Tate; Sharon Tate's unborn son (Paul Polanski); Leno LaBianca; Rosemary LaBianca
- Perpetrators: Tex Watson; Patricia Krenwinkel; Leslie Van Houten; Susan Atkins; Clem Grogan; Linda Kasabian; Charles Manson
- Motive: Undetermined

The Tate–LaBianca murders were a series of murders perpetrated by members of the Manson Family cult during August 9–10, 1969, in Los Angeles, California, under the direction of Tex Watson and Charles Manson. The perpetrators killed five people (not including the unborn child of an 8½ month pregnant Sharon Tate) on the night of August 8–9: Tate and her companions Jay Sebring, Abigail Folger, Wojciech Frykowski and Steven Parent. The following evening, the Family murdered the supermarket executive Leno LaBianca and his wife, Rosemary, at their home in Los Feliz, Los Angeles.

On the night of August 8–9, four members of the Family – Watson, Susan Atkins, Patricia Krenwinkel and Linda Kasabian – drove from Spahn Ranch to 10050 Cielo Drive in Benedict Canyon, the home Tate shared with her husband, the film director Roman Polanski. The group murdered Tate and her unborn child. Also killed were her houseguests: Sebring, a celebrity hairdresser; Folger, heiress to the Folgers coffee fortune; her boyfriend Frykowski, an aspiring screenwriter; and Parent, an 18-year-old visiting the guest house caretaker. Polanski was not home as he was working on a film in Europe. Manson was a cult leader and would-be musician who had tried to get a contract with record producer Terry Melcher, who had previously rented the house.

The following night, the four participants in the Cielo Drive killings, in addition to Manson, Leslie Van Houten and Steve "Clem" Grogan, committed two more murders. Manson had allegedly said he would show them how to do it. Kasabian drove the group to 3301 Waverly Drive. Manson left with Atkins, Grogan and Kasabian in the car and told the others to hitchhike back to the ranch. Watson, Krenwinkel and Van Houten killed the couple in the early morning hours of August 10.

== Tate murders ==
Tate murders
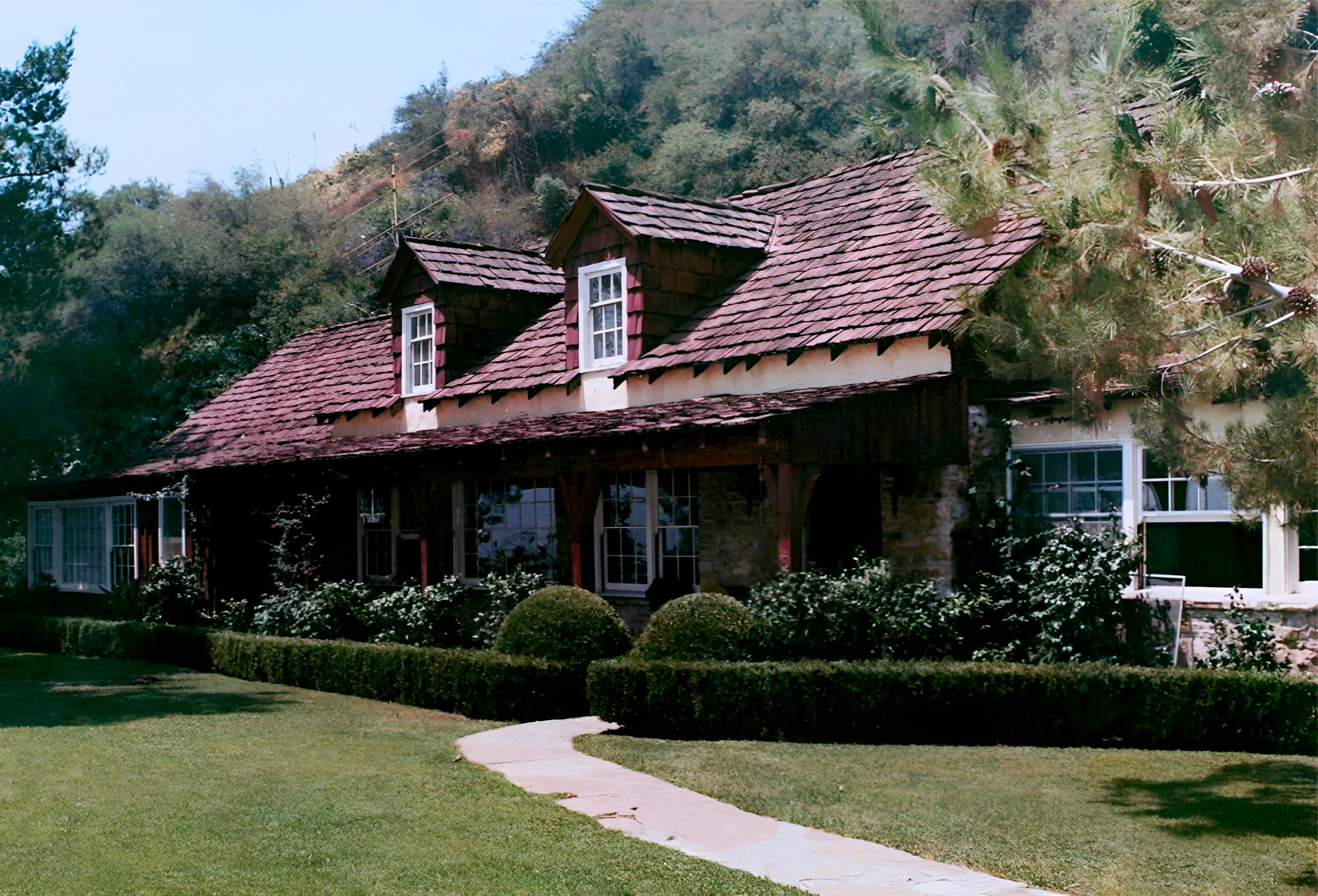
- 10050 Cielo Drive
- Location: 34°05′38″N 118°25′57″W; 10050 Cielo Drive; Los Angeles, California
- Date: August 9, 1969 (57 years, 3 months ago)
- Target: Home invasion
- Attack type: Mass stabbing, shooting
- Weapons: .22 caliber Hi-Standard "Buntline Special" revolver, clasp-type Buck knives
- Deaths: 6 (Note: including Sharon Tate’s unborn son)
- Victims: Abigail Folger; Wojciech Frykowski; Steven Parent; Jay Sebring; Sharon Tate; Paul Polanski (Note: Sharon Tate’s unborn son)
- Perpetrators: Susan Atkins; Patricia Krenwinkel; Tex Watson
- Motive: Unknown

On the night of August 8, 1969, Tex Watson took Susan Atkins, Linda Kasabian and Patricia Krenwinkel to 10050 Cielo Drive in Benedict Canyon, Los Angeles, California. Watson claims Charles Manson had instructed him go to the house and "totally destroy" everyone inside, and to do it "as gruesome as you can." Manson told the women to do as Watson instructed them.

The occupants of the house at Cielo Drive that evening were movie actress Sharon Tate, the wife of film director Roman Polanski, who was 8 1/2 months pregnant; her friend and former lover Jay Sebring, a noted celebrity hairstylist; Polanski's friend and aspiring screenwriter Wojciech Frykowski; and Frykowski's girlfriend Abigail Folger, heiress to the Folgers coffee fortune and daughter of Peter Folger. Also present on the property were William Garretson, the caretaker, and his friend Steven Parent. Polanski was in Europe working on a film.

Watson and the three women arrived at Cielo Drive just past midnight on August 9. Watson climbed a telephone pole near the main gate and cut the phone line to the house. The group backed their car to the bottom of the hill that led to the estate and walked back up to the house. Thinking the gate might be electrified or equipped with an alarm, they climbed a brushy embankment to the right of the gate and entered the grounds.

Headlights approached the intruders from within the property, and Watson ordered the women to hide in the bushes. He stepped out and ordered the approaching driver, who turned out to be Parent, to halt. Watson leveled a .22 caliber revolver at Parent, who begged him not to hurt him, claiming that he would not say anything. Watson instead lunged at Parent with a knife, giving him a defensive slash wound on the palm of his hand that severed tendons and tore his watch off his wrist, then shot him four times in the chest and abdomen, killing him in the front seat of his white 1965 AMC Rambler. Watson turned off the ignition and pushed the car away from the gate.

Watson next cut the screen of a window, then told Kasabian to keep watch down by the gate; she walked over to Parent's car and waited. He removed the screen, entered through the window and let Atkins and Krenwinkel in through the front door. He whispered to Atkins and awoke Frykowski, who was sleeping on the living room couch. Watson kicked Frykowski in the head, and Frykowski asked him who he was and what he was doing there. Watson replied, "I'm the devil, and I'm here to do the devil's business."

On Watson's direction, Atkins and Krenwinkel found the house's three other occupants and forced them to the living room. He began to tie Tate and Sebring together by their necks with a long nylon rope which he had brought, then slung it over one of the living room's ceiling beams. Sebring protested the murderers' rough treatment of the pregnant Tate, so Watson shot him. Folger was taken momentarily back to her bedroom for her purse, and she gave the murderers $70. Watson then stabbed Sebring 7 times.

Frykowski's hands had been bound with a towel, but he freed himself and began struggling with Atkins, who stabbed at his legs with a knife. He fought his way out the front door and onto the porch, but Watson caught up with him, struck him over the head with the gun multiple times, stabbed him repeatedly, and shot him twice.

Kasabian had heard "horrifying sounds" and moved toward the house from her position in the driveway. She told Atkins that someone was coming in an attempt to stop the murders. Inside the house, Folger escaped from Krenwinkel and fled out a bedroom door to the pool area. Krenwinkel pursued her and caught her on the front lawn where she stabbed her and tackled her to the ground. Watson then helped kill her; her assailants stabbed her a total of 28 times. Frykowski struggled across the lawn, but Watson continued to stab him, killing him. Frykowski suffered 51 stab wounds, and had also been struck 13 times in the head with the butt of Watson's gun, which bent the barrel and broke off one side of the gun grip, which was recovered at the scene.

In the house, Tate pleaded to be allowed to live long enough to give birth, and offered herself as a hostage in an attempt to save the life of her unborn child, but both Atkins and Watson stabbed Tate 16 times, killing her. The coroner's inquest found that Tate was still alive when she was hanged with the nylon rope, although the cause of her death was determined as a "massive hemorrhage", while in Sebring's murder it was found that he was hanged lifeless.

According to Watson, Manson had told the women to "leave a sign—something witchy". Atkins wrote "pig" on the front door in Tate's blood. Atkins claims she did this to copycat the murder scene of Gary Hinman in order to get Manson Family member Bobby Beausoleil out of jail, who was in custody for the murder; Beausoleil had written "political piggy" in Hinman's blood on his wall after stabbing him to death.

== LaBianca murders ==
LaBianca murders
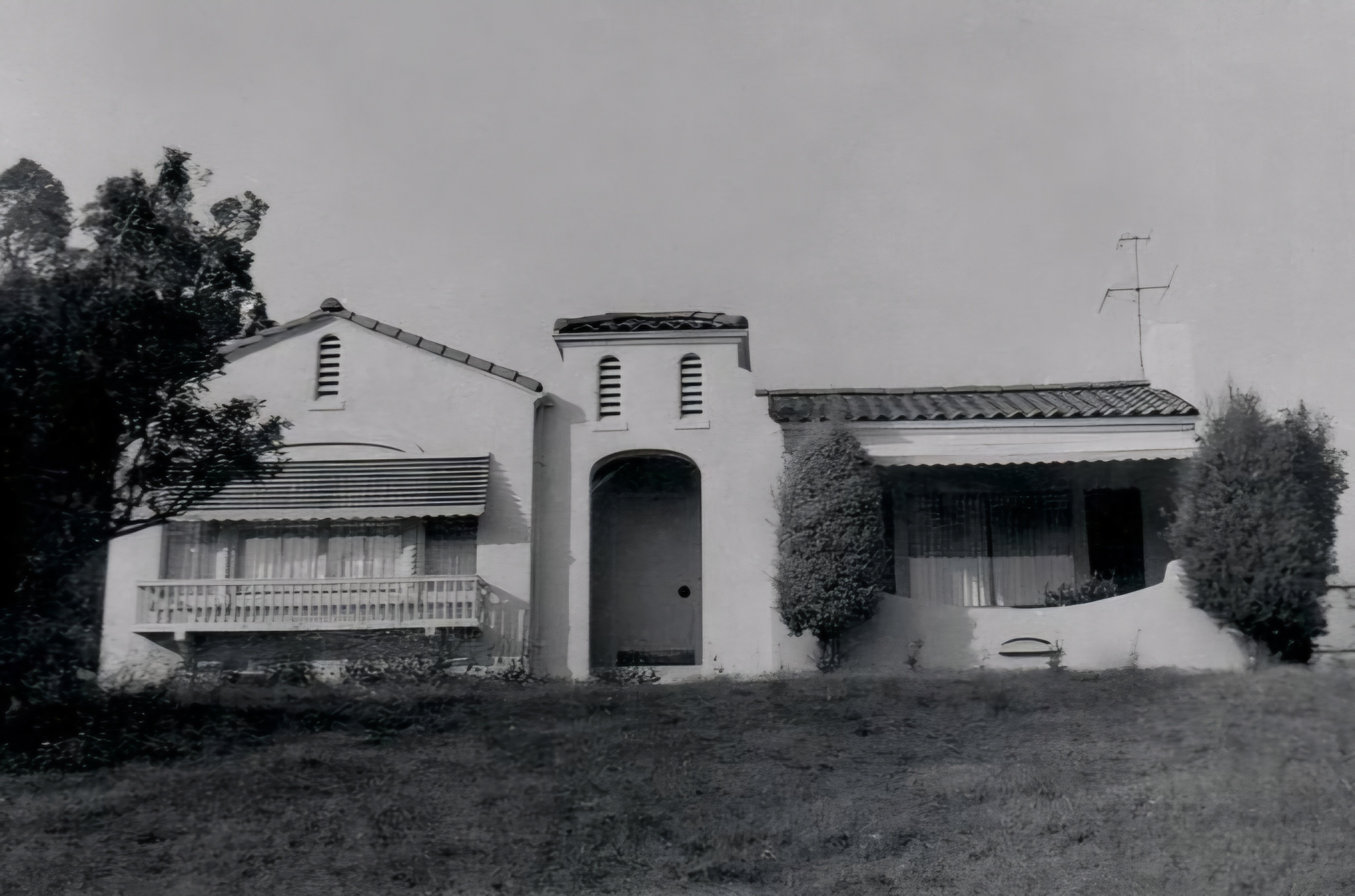
- 3301 Waverly Drive
- Location: 3301 Waverly Drive; Los Angeles, California
- Date: August 10, 1969
- Attack type: Mass stabbing, shooting
- Deaths: 2
- Victims: Leno LaBianca; Rosemary LaBianca
- Perpetrators: Tex Watson; Patricia Krenwinkel; Leslie Van Houten accomplices – Charles Manson; Susan Atkins; Clem Grogan; Linda Kasabian
- Motive: Unknown

The four murderers plus Charles Manson, Leslie Van Houten and Clem Grogan went for a drive the following night. Manson was allegedly displeased with the panic and flight of the victims in the previous night's murders. He told Kasabian to drive to a house at 3301 Waverly Drive in the Los Feliz section of Los Angeles, located next door to a home where Manson and Family members had attended a party the previous year.

According to Atkins and Kasabian, Manson disappeared up the driveway and returned to say that he had tied up the house's occupants. Then Watson, Krenwinkel, and Van Houten entered the home. Watson claims in his autobiography that Manson went up alone, then returned to take him up to the house with him. Manson pointed out a sleeping man through a window, and the two entered through the unlocked back door. Watson claims Manson roused the sleeping Leno LaBianca from the couch at gunpoint and had Watson bind his hands with a leather strip. Rosemary was brought into the living room from the bedroom, and Watson covered the couple's heads with pillowcases which he bound in place with lamp cords. Manson left, and Krenwinkel and Van Houten entered the house.

Watson had complained to Manson earlier of the inadequacy of the previous night's weapons. Watson sent the women from the kitchen to the bedroom, where Rosemary LaBianca had been returned, while he went to the living room and began stabbing Leno LaBianca with a chrome-plated bayonet. The first thrust went into his throat. Watson heard a scuffle in the bedroom and went in there to discover Rosemary LaBianca keeping the women at bay by swinging the lamp tied to her neck. He stabbed her several times with the bayonet, then returned to the living room and resumed attacking Leno, whom he stabbed a total of 12 times. He then carved the word "WAR" into his abdomen. Watson returned to the bedroom and found Krenwinkel stabbing Rosemary with a knife from the kitchen. Van Houten stabbed her approximately 16 times in the back and the exposed buttocks. Van Houten claimed at trial that Rosemary LaBianca was already dead during the stabbing. Evidence showed that many of the 41 stab wounds had, in fact, been inflicted post-mortem. Watson then cleaned off the bayonet and showered, while Krenwinkel wrote "Rise" and "Death to pigs" on the walls and the misspelled “Healter Skelter” on the refrigerator door, all in LaBianca's blood. She gave Leno LaBianca 14 puncture wounds with an ivory-handled, two-tined carving fork, which she left jutting out of his stomach. She also planted a steak knife in his throat.

Meanwhile, Manson drove the other three Family members who had departed Spahn with him that evening to the Venice home of the Lebanese actor Saladin Nader. Manson left them there and drove back to Spahn Ranch, leaving them and the LaBianca killers to hitchhike home. According to Kasabian, Manson wanted his followers to murder Nader in his apartment, but Kasabian claims she thwarted this murder by deliberately knocking on the wrong apartment door and waking a stranger. The group abandoned the murder plan and left, but Atkins defecated in the stairwell on the way out.

== Investigation, trial, and sentencing ==
In initial confessions to cellmates at Sybil Brand Institute, Atkins said she killed Tate. In later statements to her attorney, to prosecutor Vincent Bugliosi, and before a grand jury, Atkins indicated Tate had been stabbed by Tex Watson.

In his 1978 autobiography, Watson said he had stabbed Tate and that Atkins had never touched her. Since he was aware that the prosecutor, Bugliosi, and the jury, that had tried the other Tate–LaBianca defendants, were convinced Atkins had stabbed Tate, he falsely testified that he did not stab her.

The five perpetrators – Atkins, Krenwinkel, Manson, Van Houten, and Watson – were each tried and convicted for their roles in the Tate–LaBianca murders. Originally, each defendant received a death sentence. However, in 1972, the Supreme Court of California ruled in People v. Anderson that the state's then-current death penalty laws were unconstitutional. As a result, the Anderson decision spared the lives of 107 death row inmates in California, including Charles Manson and his four "family members". Subsequently, the death sentences for each of the five perpetrators convicted in the Tate–LaBianca murders were commuted to life in prison, which – by law – included the possibility of parole.

- Susan Atkins (1948–2009): Atkins remained in prison until her death from brain cancer at age 61 in 2009. At the time of her death, she was California's longest-serving female inmate. Atkins had been denied parole 14 times, and her request for compassionate release had also been denied.
- Patricia Krenwinkel (born 1947): Imprisoned in 1971, Krenwinkel remains incarcerated. Following the 2009 death of fellow Manson gang member Susan Atkins, Krenwinkel is now the longest-incarcerated female inmate in the California penal system. She has been denied parole 15 times, most recently in 2025. Following revisions to California parole laws and policy changes by the sitting Los Angeles DA, a parole panel recommended her release for the first time in May 2022; however, this parole recommendation was overturned by California governor Gavin Newsom (who had similarly previously overturned the parole recommendation for Manson family member Leslie Van Houten).
- Charles Manson (1934–2017): Manson remained imprisoned until his death from cardiac arrest resulting from respiratory failure and colon cancer on November 19, 2017. He was just a few days past his 83rd birthday, and had spent all but 13 years of his life in some sort of supervised setting (either prison, reformatory, or boys' home). While in prison, Manson had been denied parole 12 times. After 1997, he refused to attend any of his parole hearings.
- Leslie Van Houten (born 1949): Upon her conviction and death sentence in 1971, at the age of 21, Van Houten became the youngest woman ever put on California's death row, as well as the youngest member of the Manson Family convicted of murder. (Her original conviction and death sentence was overturned on appeal. She was later retried and sentenced to life in prison with the possibility of parole.) She was released on parole on July 11, 2023, after being denied parole 22 times.
- Charles "Tex" Watson (born 1945): Watson remains incarcerated. He has been denied parole 17 times, most recently in 2021. While imprisoned, Watson claims that he became a born-again Christian.

== Sociocultural impact ==
The Tate–LaBianca murders "profoundly shook America's perception of itself" and "effectively sounded the death knell of '60s counterculture". In her 1979 essay collection The White Album, Joan Didion, who knew Tate and lived close to the site of the murders, wrote: "Many people I know believe that the Sixties ended abruptly on August 9, 1969, ended at the exact moment when word of the murders on Cielo Drive traveled like brushfire through the community, and in a sense this is true. The tension broke that day. The paranoia was fulfilled." Additionally, the ritualistic nature of the murders laid a foundation for the rise of the Satanic panic.

Some critics have claimed that it led to the proliferation of "darkly psychosexual, conspiracy-laced cultural exploration of America's seedy underbelly" by the movie industry, including films such as Dirty Harry (1971). Film critic Erik Morse writes that the rapid recognition of Tate's murder and, soon after, the idolization of her murder, brought about a dark period of film in Hollywood, filled with "ultraviolence, gore, satanism and freakouts". Morse cites Ian Cooper's 2018 book The Manson Family on Film and Television, where Cooper coins the term "Mansonsploitation", which he defines as the violent, disturbing genre that Hollywood grew fascinated in shortly following the Tate–LaBianca murders. Conversely some productions, such as George Lucas' space opera Star Wars (1977), avoided invoking the Tate–LaBianca murders and the Manson Family; Lucas changed the surname of Luke Skywalker and Anakin Skywalker as their original surname ("Starkiller" in all screenplays) could be misconstrued as "celebrity killer".

Film scholar Reid Anderson believes that Tate's image has been substituted with "hyperreal" depictions of her at her death in films that have attempted to recreate the Manson family murders. Aligning with Morse's description of the sudden emergence of gory film following the Manson family murders, Anderson claims that it was the "circulation of disingenuous information following the events of August 9th" that inspired Mansonsploitation. Both critics agree it was the spread of misinformation directly following Tate's murder, Hollywood's near-immediate obsession with the details of her murder, and reimagined versions of Tate in Mansonsploitation films that resulted in the alteration of Tate's likeness among her audience, as they tried to process the reality of her murder by searching for the most authentic version of her last moments.

== In popular culture ==
=== Helter Skelter: The True Story of The Manson Murders ===
In 1974, after leaving the DA's office, prosecutor Vincent Bugliosi, jointly with Curt Gentry, wrote a book about the Manson trial called Helter Skelter: The True Story of The Manson Murders. The book won an Edgar Award from the Mystery Writers of America for the best true-crime book of the year. The book was twice adapted as a television film, first in 1976, then later in 2004. As of 2015, Helter Skelter was the bestselling true crime book in publishing history, with more than seven million copies sold.

=== Film and television ===
Several films recounted the Tate–LaBianca murders and the subsequent criminal trials:

- Manson, a 1973 documentary about Manson and his followers
- Helter Skelter, a 1976 television film based on the 1974 book by prosecutor Vincent Bugliosi and Curt Gentry
- The Manson Family, a 1997 film by Jim Van Bebber
- Helter Skelter, a 2004 television film remake of the 1976 TV film of the same name
- Aquarius (2015 TV series)
- Wolves at the Door, a 2016 film
- Mindhunter, a 2017 Netflix series
- Dateline NBC (1992– / TV series), "The Summer of Manson", Season 25, Episode 42
- American Horror Story (2011– / TV series) Season 7, Episode 10
- Charlie Says, a 2018 drama film starring Matt Smith as Manson
- The Haunting of Sharon Tate, a 2019 supernatural horror film starring Hilary Duff as Tate
- Once Upon a Time in Hollywood, a 2019 comedy-drama film featuring a fictionalized account of the evening of the murders. In the film, Tate survives the murder attempt thanks to intervention from protagonists Rick Dalton and Cliff Booth.
- Helter Skelter: An American Myth, a comprehensive 2020 six-part documentary film about Manson, the Family, the murders and the trial on EPIX network
- CHAOS: The Manson Murders, a 2025 documentary film based on Tom O'Neill's book, distributed on Netflix

=== Books ===
In addition to Bugliosi's Helter Skelter: The True Story of The Manson Murders (1974), these are the other books about the murders:

- The Girls, a 2016 novel by Emma Cline loosely inspired by the Manson family
- CHAOS: Charles Manson, the CIA, and the Secret History of the Sixties, a 2019 non-fiction book by Tom O'Neill with Dan Piepenbring
- The Family: The Life and Crimes of Charles Manson and His Followers by Ed Sanders (1971, new edition 2023)
- Assassins... Serial Killers... Corrupt Cops...: Chasing the News in a Skirt and High Heels, a 2012 non-fiction book by Mary Neiswender featuring first hand accounts of the author's interviews with Manson

=== Music ===
- The Manson Family: An Opera, a 1990 opera by John Moran
- Cielo Drive, a song by Car Bomb, an American mathcore band.
- DI-1-9026, a song by Scraping Foetus Off The Wheel from the 1985 album Nail
