= CHAOS: The Manson Murders =

- Film poster
- Directed by: Errol Morris
- Based on: CHAOS: Charles Manson, the CIA, and the Secret History of the Sixties by Tom O'Neill with Dan Piepenbring
- Produced by: Errol Morris; Robert Fernandez; Steven Hathaway
- Cinematography: Igor Martinovic; Robert Chappell
- Edited by: Steven Hathaway
- Music by: Paul Leonard-Morgan
- Production companies: Moxie Pictures; Fourth Floor Productions
- Distributed by: Netflix
- Release dates: March 6, 2025 (MoMA Documentary Fortnight); March 7, 2025 (Netflix)
- Running time: 96 minutes
- Country: United States
- Language: English

CHAOS: The Manson Murders is a 2025 American documentary film co-produced and directed by Errol Morris. It is an adaptation of the 2019 nonfiction book CHAOS: Charles Manson, the CIA, and the Secret History of the Sixties, written by Tom O'Neill with Dan Piepenbring. The film premiered at the Museum of Modern Art and was released on Netflix on March 7, 2025.

== Production ==
On July 19, 2019, Variety reported that Amazon Studios purchased the film rights to the book CHAOS: Charles Manson, the CIA, and the Secret History of the Sixties. Before its publication, an adaptation of O'Neill's story was originally in development by Errol Morris in collaboration with Netflix, but O'Neill backed out of the project over creative differences.

On December 20, 2023, Screen International published an interview about Morris' newest film The Pigeon Tunnel. At the end of the interview, Morris stated that after completing his next film, Separated, he would begin production on an adaptation of O'Neill's book for Netflix.

In late January 2025, Netflix listed, without poster art, CHAOS: The Manson Murders.

== Release ==
The film had its world premiere in the Documentary Fortnight series at the Museum of Modern Art in New York, on March 6, 2025. It was released worldwide on Netflix on March 7, 2025.

== Reception ==
On the review aggregator website Rotten Tomatoes, 56% of 34 critics' reviews are positive. The website's consensus reads: "Errol Morris' Chaos chases too many red herrings to prove a definitive document on the Manson cult, but it does reaffirm why this crime spree continues to haunt the public consciousness over half a century later." Metacritic, which uses a weighted average, assigned the film a score of 62 out of 100, based on 12 critics, indicating "generally favorable" reviews.

Alissa Wilkinson of The New York Times wrote that the film was "compelling" for its commentary on the enduring interest in Manson not being the result of the murders he plotted but rather the transformative nature of his mind control over followers, whilst lamenting that Morris's film contained elements of the "now-established Netflix true crime style".

Daniel Fienberg of The Hollywood Reporter assessed the film as being "a story about the need for stories when it comes to explaining the unexplainable". Fienberg, however, criticized Morris's approach to the Manson case as intentionally dull, saying it contained 45 minutes of "bland regurgitation" and lacked an essential "story" to process the tragic events. Fienberg also felt O'Neill's conspiracy theory was not "given room to make total sense", resulting in a "complicated meta-commentary delivered loosely in the guise of a ghoulish conspiracy thriller, presented in rushed form to an audience that would happily devour many more hours of the actual ghoulish conspiracy thriller that this is not."
