= Paul Watkins (Manson Family) =

American autobiographer (1950–1990)

Paul Alan Watkins (January 25, 1950 – August 3, 1990) was an American man who was a member of Charles Manson's "Family". In the period leading up to Manson's trial for the Tate–LaBianca murders, Watkins provided the prosecution with information that clarified the "Helter Skelter" motive.

== Background ==
By his own account, Paul Watkins lived "a pretty standard middle-class American upbringing," including being in a Christian family. His early years were spent in Sidon, Lebanon, where his father worked on a pipeline. The move to Lebanon took place when Watkins was an infant. After four years in Lebanon, the family moved to Beaumont, Texas, and then to Thousand Oaks, California. When Watkins was a child, he enjoyed attending church and hiking in the oak groves near his home.

During adolescence, Watkins became a Bible student and was active in youth organizations and church camps. At age 13, he became involved in evangelicalism, at first because he enjoyed the music and singing. By the time he entered high school, his musical interests had become a "passion"; his religious interests had "waned."

Watkins dropped out of high school during his senior year, in which school officials distressed by his use of psychedelic drugs terminated his term as student-body president, a position he held in every grade from first through eleventh. Having come to find his studies less interesting than music and marijuana, he became, as he would later write, "a fugitive flower child in search of enlightenment and truth." In the same December 1967 week in which he was put on probation after an arrest for marijuana possession, two friends of his were returned dead from the Vietnam War.

== Joining the Family ==
On March 16, 1968, several months after his departure from high school, Watkins met Charles Manson in Los Angeles County’s Topanga Canyon, at a house where Manson and several Family members were squatting. Watkins had come to the house to visit a friend who turned out no longer to be living there. After enjoying a candy bar, root beer, marijuana, and a night of group sex, Watkins left.

For Watkins, there followed three-and-a-half months of hippie desultoriness, most of it spent taking care of a farm that was near Big Sur and whose owner had picked up the hitchhiking youth before going on to Hawaii. Watkins returned to the Los Angeles area, where, at a San Fernando Valley street corner, he was recognized and picked up in a hollowed-out school bus that was painted black, driven by the same two Manson girls, who had greeted him at the door of the Topanga Canyon house. As the girls took him to the Family's new camp at Spahn Movie Ranch, near Chatsworth, one of them remarked that Manson was Jesus Christ. It was July 4, 1968.

Watkins remained with the Family and became Manson's chief lieutenant. On October 31, he set out with the others in the group's school bus to Goler Wash, near Death Valley. There, over the next few days, Manson set up additional Family bases at two unused (or little-used) ranches, Myers and Barker.

== Helter Skelter involvement ==
On New Year's Eve, 1968, Watkins was around the Family campfire at Myers Ranch when Manson delivered the Helter Skelter prophecy. According to Watkins, Manson had been predicting blacks would rise up in rebellion in America's cities. Now, he explained that The Beatles, too, were making that prediction, with the song "Helter Skelter" on the White Album. More than that, the musical group wanted Manson and the Family to create an album of their own, to trigger the predicted events. Manson, according to Watkins, said:

Are you hip to what the Beatles are saying?... Dig it, they're telling it like it is. They know what's happening in the city; blackie is getting ready. They put the revolution to music... it's 'Helter-Skelter.' Helter-Skelter is coming down. Hey, their album is getting the young love [America's youth] ready, man, building up steam. Our album is going to pop the cork right out of the bottle.

Before long, Manson had moved the Family to a Canoga Park house where they undertook preparations for Helter Skelter. They worked on music for their intended album and began preparing dune buggies and other vehicles for their escape to Death Valley, where, according to Watkins, they would survive the America-ravaging war.

Watkins took the prophecy seriously. One day, as he looked out a window of the Canoga Park house, he wondered to himself whether the violence of Helter Skelter would reach the Family. His fear that the Family was lingering too long in the soon-to-be-war-torn Los Angeles area prompted him, in late June 1969, to ask Manson when the group would be leaving for the desert. According to Watkins, Manson assured him Helter Skelter was ready to happen.

== Desert camps ==
According to Watkins, Manson's remark disturbed Watkins, who had no trouble recognizing it as an indication the Family would be undertaking murders. When Manson instructed him to transport supplies to the desert camps, Watkins embraced the opportunity to get away. At the same time, he was unsure whether to sever himself from the commune; "my insides were tied to Charlie and the Family in ways I hadn't begun to sort out".

At Barker Ranch, Watkins came under the influence of Paul Crockett, a middle-aged prospector who, with metaphysical musings of his own, had begun to influence a male Family member and female Family member who had been left to watch the desert camp. Returning briefly to Spahn Ranch, Watkins changed his relationship with Manson by using a suggestion by Crockett; he asked that Manson "[release him of all his] agreements."

Within a few days, Watkins had settled in at Barker, with Crockett and the others. About a month later, on August 9, 1969, the group saw a television broadcast while they were in Kingman, Arizona, with plans to do some mining there. The news was of the Tate murders, which had taken place in Los Angeles overnight. "Wouldn't it be somethin' if old Charlie did that," said Crockett, whom Watkins and the others had made aware of Helter Skelter. Though chilled by the remark, Watkins dismissed it as a bad joke.

The next day, in a Las Vegas newspaper report of the LaBianca murders, which had taken place overnight, Watkins saw that police were dismissing a connection between the two sets of murders and that a suspect in the Tate murders was already in custody. (The suspect was William Garretson, a youth who was employed as caretaker of the property where the Tate murders took place and who happened to have been the only person found alive on the premises the morning after the killings. By August 11, having been effectively dismissed as a suspect, he was released from custody.) The story did not indicate that the words "Healter [sic] Skelter" had been written in LaBianca's blood at the crime site, that information not having leaked to the press.

== Continued connection to Manson ==
Within weeks of the murders, Manson and the Family members had come to Goler Wash, which they began fortifying for Helter Skelter. For a month, Manson, situated at Myers Ranch, vied with Crockett for psychological sway over the Family members who had come into the prospector's orbit. Manson deployed his women as sexual lures, undertook intimidating visits in which he and others would fire shotguns on the Barker Ranch property, and jousted with Crockett in abstract discussions. A third male Family member came to Crockett's side, while the female Family member he'd influenced had left the area with a friend of his, whom she promptly married.

Watkins continued to vacillate. He played music with the Family, had initially preserved a sexual relationship with one of the Family girls, and declined to dismiss Helter Skelter. But when, for instance, Manson asked him to join the efforts to find the entry to the underground hideaway in which the Family was supposedly to survive the cataclysm, he declined to do so. Even after Watkins helped two of the Family girls leave the area, the relationship with Manson survived, though the incident resulted in Manson's threatening Watkins with a knife and a pistol.

A breaking-point arrived on a night when Manson snuck on his hands and knees into the Barker Ranch bunkhouse. Outside were Bruce Davis and Tex Watson, both of whom would ultimately be convicted of murders they had already committed under Manson's direction. Although Manson was humiliated when Crockett, Watkins, and the two other defectors awoke before he could do anything, the four evidently concluded things were getting even more dangerous than they had been up until then. Watkins and the three others soon left Barker Ranch. Before long, Watkins had joined two of them in the office of the local deputy sheriff.

== Choice to testify ==
In the second week of October 1969, right after Watkins left Goler Wash, the ranches were raided by law enforcement. Manson and others were arrested on vehicle theft and other charges that had no apparent connection with the murders. By the middle of November, Manson and Family members had become suspects in the Tate–LaBianca killings. The solving of the case was announced by LAPD at the beginning of December.

By Christmas time, Watkins had told the Los Angeles District Attorney's office what he knew of the Family's activities. He related a Manson admission, made to him shortly after the Family had moved to the desert, of participation in the killing of Spahn ranch hand Donald "Shorty" Shea, murdered not long after the Tate–LaBianca crimes. Even so, the tie between Watkins and the Family was unbroken. Watkins visited Manson at the Los Angeles County jail and moved in with Family members at a house in Van Nuys. He continued to visit Manson and acted as messenger between Manson and Manson’s female co-defendants. Moreover, he assumed quasi-leadership of the remnants of the Family.

Around the end of March 1970, Watkins split with Family members, following a blowup between him and a trio of Manson girls. This occurred at Spahn Ranch, to which the group had returned. The girls had learned of statements that Watkins had made to law officers and that Manson's lawyer had obtained through an inevitable motion for discovery. Told he was a "Judas," Watkins walked out. Later that night, he was badly burned in a fire that broke out in a Volkswagen van in which he was sleeping. He was "unsure of the origin of the blaze," which could have been caused by a candle he'd been using to read or a marijuana cigarette he'd been smoking before he fell asleep. A Family member would later claim to have set the blaze.

In May, after he had healed, Watkins decided he would testify against Manson. His decision was occasioned by a threat delivered from Manson via Family members: "Charlie says when he gets out, you better not be around the desert."

== Importance of testimony ==
Watkins testified against Manson in October 1970, some months into the trial in which Manson was ultimately found guilty of the murders. The testimony of Watkins and one of the other male defectors traced the growth of Manson's view of Helter Skelter from a vague vision to an inspiration for crime. Most important were the details provided by Watkins in the period leading up to the trial, which enabled the prosecution to understand Manson's stake in the war the killings were intended to trigger. The details made clear that, in its complete form, the vision ended with Manson and the Family as the lone existing whites, presiding over blacks whose antipathy to whites would have been discharged in the gruesome conflict. At war's end, Charles Manson, reform-school boy and convicted criminal, originally from Cincinnati, Ohio, would rule California.

== Later life ==
Watkins went on to become the founder and first president of the Death Valley Chamber of Commerce. In addition, he lectured on cult psychology and effects of substance abuse.

Watkins appeared as himself in the 1973 documentary film Manson. The film featured music composed and performed by Watkins and Brooks Poston, the other Family defector who testified against Manson. For a period, Watkins and Poston performed music in clubs in the Inyo County area under the band name "Desert Sun", Inyo County being the location of the desert ranches to which Watkins first came with Manson.

=== CNN interview and My Life with Charles Manson ===
In 1989, after he had been diagnosed with cancer, Watkins appeared on CNN's Larry King Live. The segment was hosted by Maureen Reagan. During the interview, a woman identifying herself as "Jenny" called in and conversed with Watkins and Reagan. Jenny said she had begun living with the Family "about six months after the murders." Watkins recognized the caller and questioned the direction of her remarks ("I mean where are we going with this?").

In My Life with Charles Manson, the 1979 book Watkins co-authored with Guillermo Soledad, he had spoken of "Ginny". She was a girl new to the Family around February 1970, and with whom, on the suggestion of Family member Squeaky Fromme, he had conspired to slip a dose of LSD to Family member Bruce Davis, during the latter's trial at that time for auto theft. This conspiratorial activity had taken place before the decision by Watkins to testify against Manson.

=== Death ===
Watkins died in 1990 at age 40, of leukemia. He was the unofficial mayor of Tecopa, a small Death Valley town, where he lived with his second wife and their two daughters, one of whom is writer Claire Vaye Watkins.
