= Helter Skelter (book) =

1974 book by Vincent Bugliosi and Curt Gentry

Helter Skelter: The True Story of The Manson Murders
- First edition of W. W. Norton & Co., 1974
- Author: Vincent Bugliosi with Curt Gentry
- Language: English
- Subject: Charles Manson and the "Manson Family"
- Genre: True crime
- Publisher: W. W. Norton & Company
- Publication date: 1974
- Publication place: United States
- Media type: Print (hardcover)
- Pages: 502 pp
- ISBN: 9780393087000
- OCLC: 15164618

Helter Skelter: The True Story of The Manson Murders is a 1974 book by Vincent Bugliosi and Curt Gentry. Bugliosi had served as the prosecutor in the 1970 trial of Charles Manson. The book presents his firsthand account of the cases of Manson, Susan Atkins, Patricia Krenwinkel, and other members of the self-described Manson Family. It is the best-selling true crime book in history.

== Description ==
The book recounts and assesses the investigation, arrest, and prosecution of Charles Manson and his followers for the notorious 1969 murders of Leno and Rosemary LaBianca, pregnant actress Sharon Tate, and several others.

The book takes its title from the apocalyptic race war that Manson allegedly believed would occur, which in turn took its name from the song "Helter Skelter" by the Beatles. Manson had been particularly fascinated by the Beatles' White Album, from which the song came.

== Reception and legacy ==
Helter Skelter was first published in the United States in 1974 and became a bestseller. The book won the 1975 Edgar Award for Best Fact Crime book, and was the basis for two television films, released in 1976 and 2004. At the time of Bugliosi's death in 2015, it had sold over seven million copies, making it the best-selling true crime book in history. The book was also the primary influence for the story line of the 2008 film The Strangers.

Since its initial hardcover edition, the book has had several printings as a mass market paperback. A 25th anniversary edition (since the crimes) was published in 1994 with an update added by Bugliosi. Bugliosi himself narrated the Talking Books unabridged audiobook at the time of the book's original release, and read an abridged version of his update for the 25th anniversary edition abridged audiobook read by Robert Foxworth. Audible.com commissioned Scott Brick to read an unabridged version of the 25th anniversary edition in 2011.

== See also ==
- 1974 in literature
- CHAOS: Charles Manson, the CIA, and the Secret History of the Sixties
