= Greg King (author) =

American author (1964–2025)

Greg King (November 23, 1964 – April 25, 2025) was an American historian and author, specializing in late Imperial Russia and the Bavaria of Ludwig II, though he wrote on a variety of subjects.

== Biography ==
Greg King was born Gregory Scott King on November 23, 1964, in Everett, Washington to Roger and Helena Haga King. He had one sibling, his older sister Kathy (1955–1974). Greg's father was born in Michigan and his mother in North Carolina, both into large families. The Kings and Hagas relocated to Washington state in the 1950s where they established deep roots in the communities of Everett, Stanwood and Mount Vernon.

Greg spent his early years in Stanwood, Washington, returning with his family to north Everett as a young boy. He attended local schools, graduating from King's Garden High School in 1984, then enrolling in Edmonds Community College and subsequently the University of Washington Seattle.

During his school days, Greg was involved in student government, beginning a life-long interest in politics, which he pursued as a spectator sport. He was also deeply interested in photography and, as he entered his young adult years, became a fan of Seattle's growing music scene. He loved old horror movies, old Hollywood and reading. Greg is probably best known for his work in Imperial Russian history, producing some of the finest recent research and writing in the field. He became interested in the subject at the age of ten, after watching the movie Nicholas and Alexandra for the first time. At the time of this viewing, he was spending some extended time at home in the wake of his sister's death and filled his days with his first tentative forays into basic research and writing, assisted by a neighbor, Eileen Knauss, who gave him her typewriter to help him along. Two decades later, his work as a ten-year-old provided the seed of his first published work The Last Empress: The Life and Times of Alexandra Feodorovna, Empress of Russia.

Greg devoted the rest of his life to the study and writing of history. Fourteen of his twenty-four published books were on a multitude of Russian topics, from framing The Court of the Last Tsar to critiquing The Romanovs on Film, while other books focused on the Habsburgs, British royalty, the Gilded Age and King Ludwig II of Bavaria. A talented social historian and biographer, he also wrote books on the sinking of the famous ships Lusitania and Andrea Doria, framed as a microcosm of their societies and eras, and two centered around infamous murder cases – namely, a biography of Sharon Tate, written with the help of her mother, Doris Tate, and a study of the Leopold and Loeb murders.

A generous collaborator, Greg co-wrote more than half his books with other authors: Janet Ashton, Coryne Hall, Penny Wilson and Sue Woolmans. He assisted numerous other writers and historians with writing or research, and through his work as an editor on several magazines or book projects, notably for Joseph T. Fuhrmann and Debra Tate. Greg also appeared on numerous TV shows and podcasts as an expert in his field and acted as consultant on others. He co-founded and edited the Russia-focused Atlantis Magazine, as well as writing many of the articles, and contributed articles to the electronic British Library Journal, the European Royal History Journal, Royalty Digest Quarterly and Majesty magazine, among others. The focus of many of his articles was architecture, a major passion.

Greg King died unexpectedly in the early morning hours of April 25, 2025, at his home in Tehachapi, California; his cause of death was cardiovascular disease.

== Reviews ==
A review in the Manhattan (Kansas) Mercury praised King's books about the sinking of the Andrea Doria and the Lusitania as works of historical non-fiction which provide the reader with a "clearer understanding of the causes" of these tragedies.

== Publications ==
- The Last Empress: The Life and Times of Alexandra Feodorovna, Empress of Russia, Citadel Press, 1994
- The Mad King: The Life and Times of Ludwig II of Bavaria, Birch Lane Press, 1996
- The Man Who Killed Rasputin: Prince Felix Youssoupov and the Murder That Helped Bring Down the Russian Empire, Birch Lane Press, 1996
- The Duchess of Windsor: The Uncommon Life of Wallis Simpson, Citadel Press, 1999
- Sharon Tate and the Manson Murders, Barricade Books, 2000
- The Fate of the Romanovs, co-authored with Penny Wilson, John Wiley & Sons, 2003
- The Court of the Last Tsar: Pomp, Power and Pageantry in the Reign of Nicholas II, John Wiley & Sons, 2006
- Gilded Prism: The Konstantinovichi Grand Dukes & the Last Years of the Romanov Dynasty, co-authored with Penny Wilson, Eurohistory Press, 2006
- Twilight of Splendor: The Court of Queen Victoria During Her Diamond Jubilee Year, John Wiley & Sons, 2007
- A Season of Splendor: The Court of Mrs. Astor in Gilded Age New York, John Wiley & Sons, 2008
- The Resurrection of the Romanovs: Anastasia, Anna Anderson, and the World's Greatest Royal Mystery, co-authored with Penny Wilson, John Wiley & Sons, 2010
- The Assassination of the Archduke: Sarajevo 1914 and the Romance That Changed the World, co-authored with Sue Woolmans, St. Martin's Press, 2013
- Lusitania: Triumph, Tragedy, and the End of the Edwardian Age, co-authored with Penny Wilson, St. Martin's Press, 2015
- A Life for the Tsar, co-authored with Janet Ashton, Eurohistory Press 2016
- Twilight of Empire: The Tragedy at Mayerling and the End of the Habsburgs, co-authored with Penny Wilson, St. Martin's Press, 2017
- Imperial Crimea: Estates, Enchantments and the Last of the Romanovs, co-authored with Coryne Hall, Penny Wilson and Sue Woolmans, Kindle Direct Publishing, 2018
- Romanovs Adrift: The Russian Imperial Family in 1913-1919, co-authored with Penny Wilson, Eurohistory Press, 2018
- The Last Voyage of the Andrea Doria: The Sinking of the World's Most Glamorous Ship, co-authored with Penny Wilson, St. Martin's Press, 2020
- The Murder of the Russian Imperial Family: Revisiting the Fate of the Romanovs, co-authored with Penny Wilson, Atlantis Publications, 2022
- Nothing But The Night: Leopold & Loeb and the Truth Behind the Murder That Rocked 1920s America, co-authored with Penny Wilson, St. Martin's Press, 2022
- Nine Days That Shook The World: Russia, Revolution And The Abdication of Nicholas II, Atlantis Publications, 2023
- The Romanovs on Film: A Cinematic History of the Russian Dynasty, co-authored with Penny Wilson, Atlantis Publications, 2023
- Nicholas II and the Jews: Antisemitism in the Reign of Russia's Last Tsar, Atlantis Publications, 2025
- The Memoirs of Anatoly Mordvinov: Adjutant to Nicholas II and Grand Duke Michael Alexandrovich - Volume 1, translated and annotated with Penny Wilson, Atlantis Publications, 2025
