= Curt Gentry =

American writer (1931–2014)

Curtis Marsena "Curt" Gentry (June 13, 1931 – July 10, 2014) was an American writer, born in Lamar, Colorado.

He is best known for co-authoring, with Vincent Bugliosi, the 1974 book Helter Skelter, which detailed the Charles Manson murders. Gentry lived in San Francisco, California.

Gentry died, aged 83, on July 10, 2014, in San Francisco.

== Awards and nominations ==
Frame-Up was a nominee for the 1968 Edgar Award from the Mystery Writers of America for Best Fact Crime book.

Helter Skelter won a 1975 Edgar Award from the Mystery Writers of America for Best Fact Crime book.

J. Edgar Hoover won the 1992 PEN Center West Literary Award for Non-Fiction.

== Select works ==
- The Last Days of the Late, Great State of California, Putnam, 1968 (novel)
- J. Edgar Hoover: The Man and the Secrets, W. W. Norton, 1991, ISBN 978-0393024043
- The Madams of San Francisco: An Irreverent History of the City by the Golden Gate, Doubleday and Company, 1964, paperback reprint 1971
- The Killer Mountains: A Search for the Legendary Lost Dutchman Mine, World Publishing Company (1969)
- Helter Skelter: The True Story Of The Manson Murders (with Vincent Bugliosi)
- Frame-up: The Incredible Case of Tom Mooney and Warren Billings, W. W. Norton, 1967
- The Dolphin Guide to San Francisco and the Bay Area
- Jade: Stone of Heaven (with Richard Gump)
- John M. Browning: American Gunmaker (with J. Browning)
- The Vulnerable Americans
- A Kind of Loving, with Toni Lee Scott (autobiography), World Publishing Company (1970)
- Operation Overflight: The U-2 Spy Pilot Tells His Story for the First Time (with Francis Gary Powers) Holt, Rinehart and Winston (1971) ISBN 978-0340148235
- Second in Command: The Uncensored Account of the Capture of the Spy Ship Pueblo (with Edward R. Murphy)
