= Vincent Bugliosi =

American lawyer and true crime writer (1934–2015)

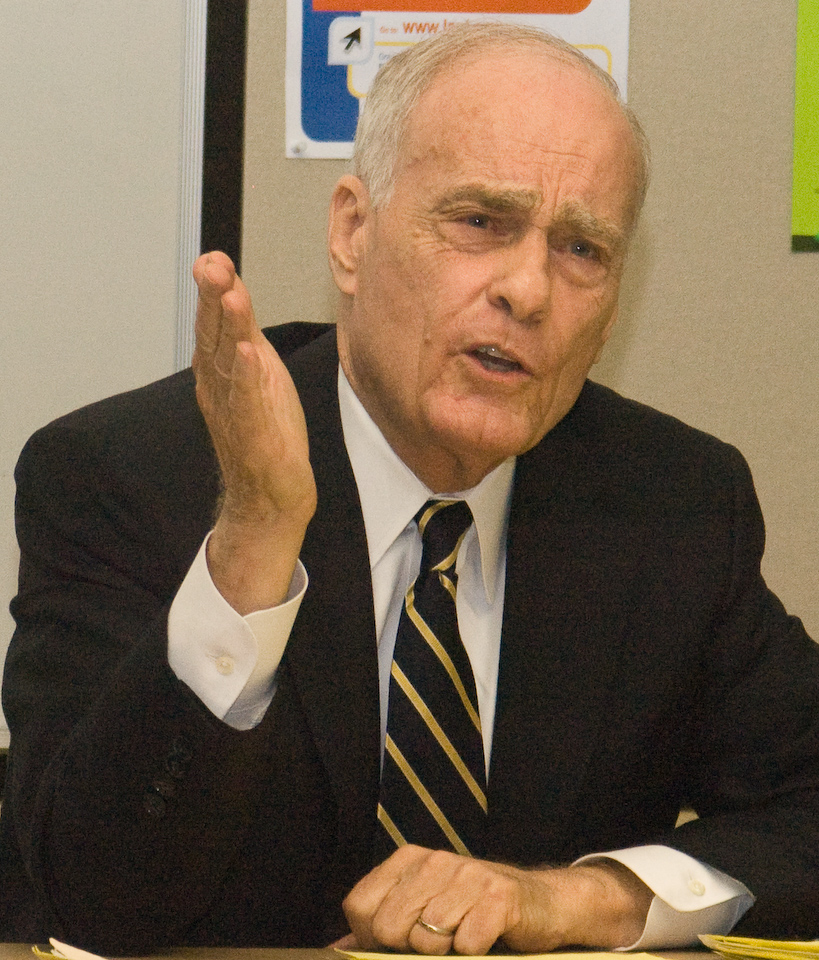
- Bugliosi in 2005
- Born: Vincent T. Bugliosi Jr. August 18, 1934; Hibbing, Minnesota, U.S.
- Died: June 6, 2015 (aged 80); Los Angeles, California, U.S.
- Education: University of Miami (BA); University of California, Los Angeles (LLB)
- Occupations: Attorney, author
- Spouse: Gail Bugliosi
- Children: 2
- Writing career
- Genres: True crime, history, politics
- Notable works: Helter Skelter (1974); And the Sea Will Tell (1991); Outrage (1996); Reclaiming History (2007); The Prosecution of George W. Bush for Murder (2008)
- Notable awards: Edgar Allan Poe Award (1975, 1979, 2008)

Vincent T. Bugliosi Jr. (/ˌbuːliˈoʊsi/; August 18, 1934 – June 6, 2015) was an American prosecutor and author who served as Deputy District Attorney for the Los Angeles County District Attorney's Office between 1964 and 1972. He became best known for successfully prosecuting Charles Manson and other defendants accused of the August 1969 Tate–LaBianca murders.

In 1972, Bugliosi left the District Attorney's (DA) office and started a private practice, which included defense cases for criminal trials. He twice ran for the DA's office but was not elected. He also began his writing career, exploring notable criminal cases, including that of O. J. Simpson and the assassinations of President John F. Kennedy (JFK) and presidential candidate Robert F. Kennedy (RFK).

== Early life and education ==
Vincent T. Bugliosi Jr. was born on August 18, 1934, in Hibbing, Minnesota, to parents of Italian descent. When he was in high school, his family moved to Los Angeles, California. Bugliosi graduated from Hollywood High School. He attended the University of Miami on a tennis scholarship and graduated in 1956. In 1964, he earned his law degree from the UCLA School of Law, where he was president of his graduating class.

== Career ==
Bugliosi began his law career in the Los Angeles County District Attorney's office in 1964, where he served as a deputy district attorney for eight years, through 1972. He successfully prosecuted 105 out of 106 felony jury trials, which included 21 murder convictions.

=== Manson prosecution ===
As a Los Angeles County Deputy District Attorney, Bugliosi came to national attention for prosecuting the seven murders that took place August 9–10, 1969, in which Sharon Tate, Jay Sebring, Abigail Folger, Wojciech Frykowski, Steven Parent, and Leno and Rosemary LaBianca were killed. Bugliosi successfully prosecuted Charles Manson, Tex Watson, Susan Atkins, Patricia Krenwinkel, and Leslie Van Houten for these murders, and each was convicted. He was credited especially with gaining conviction of Manson, who, although he had tied up the LaBiancas, had not been physically present during the actual murders.

=== Political candidate ===
In 1972, Bugliosi ran as a Democrat for Los Angeles County District Attorney against longtime incumbent Joseph Busch. Joseph Gellman was his legal counsel for this campaign. Bugliosi narrowly lost the campaign. His campaign was marred in controversy after his opponent organized a press conference where he presented Bugliosi's former milkman, Herbert H. Weisel, who claimed that Bugliosi had harassed him after he suspected that Weisel was having an affair with his wife. Bugliosi responded by claiming that Weisel had stolen $300 from his house. In turn, the Weisels sued Bugliosi and reportedly received $12,500 in compensation from Bugliosi for slander. In 1976, Bugliosi ran again after Busch died of a heart attack in 1975 but lost to interim District Attorney John Van de Kamp, who was the incumbent.

=== Private practice ===
After leaving the Los Angeles district attorney's office in 1972, Bugliosi turned to private practice. He represented three criminal defendants, achieving acquittals for each of them. Possibly his most famous client was Stephanie Stearns (referred to as "Jennifer Jenkins" in Bugliosi's book And the Sea Will Tell), whom he successfully defended in her trial for the murder of Eleanor "Muff" Graham on Palmyra Atoll, a South Pacific island.

=== O. J. Simpson case ===
Bugliosi wrote Outrage: The Five Reasons Why O. J. Simpson Got Away with Murder (1996) about the murder trial of O. J. Simpson and his acquittal for the murders of Nicole Brown Simpson and Ron Goldman. Bugliosi argues that Simpson was guilty. He criticizes the work of the district attorney, prosecutors, defense lawyers, and Judge Lance Ito. He criticized the media for characterizing Simpson's lawyers as "the Dream Team", and said that the lawyers were unremarkable and of average ability. He used his profiles to explore what he considers broader problems in American criminal justice, the media, and the political appointment of judges.

=== Bill Clinton ===
Bugliosi criticized the U.S. Supreme Court's decision in Clinton v. Jones. In his book, No Island of Sanity, he argues that the right of a president to be free of a private lawsuit while in office outweighed Paula Jones's interest in having her case brought to trial immediately.

=== George W. Bush ===
Bugliosi condemned the U.S. Supreme Court's decision in the Bush v. Gore case that decided the 2000 U.S. presidential election. He wrote a lengthy criticism of the case for The Nation, titled "None Dare Call It Treason", which he later expanded into a book titled The Betrayal of America. Some of his criticisms were depicted in the 2004 documentary Orwell Rolls in His Grave. He also believed that George W. Bush should have been charged with the murders of the thousands of American soldiers who died in the invasion of Iraq because of his belief that Bush launched the invasion under false pretenses. In his book, The Prosecution of George W. Bush for Murder, he laid out his view of evidence and outlined what questions he would ask Bush at a potential murder trial. Bugliosi testified at a House Judiciary Committee meeting on July 25, 2008, at which he urged impeachment proceedings for Bush. The book formed the basis of a 2012 documentary film, The Prosecution of an American President.

=== RFK assassination ===
Bugliosi is on record for believing that Senator Robert F. Kennedy was the victim of a criminal conspiracy. He said the following during a civil trial of the RFK assassination: "We are talking about a conspiracy to commit murder ... a conspiracy the prodigious dimensions of which would make Watergate look like a one-roach marijuana case. ... The signed statements given me perhaps can be explained away, but in the absence of a logical explanation, these statements, by simple arithmetic, add up to too many bullets and therefore, the probability of a second gun." As a result of his research, Bugliosi came to refute conspiracy theories.

=== JFK assassination ===
In 1986, Bugliosi played the part of prosecutor in an unscripted 21-hour mock television trial of Lee Harvey Oswald. His legal opponent, representing Oswald, was the well-known criminal defense attorney Gerry Spence. London Weekend Television sponsored the mock trial, which followed Texas criminal trial procedure. It also included a former Texas judge and a jury of U.S. citizens from the Dallas area who reviewed hundreds of exhibits and listened to witnesses who testified about the assassination. The jury found Oswald guilty. Spence remarked, "No other lawyer in America could have done what Vince did in this case."

The program required extensive preparation by Bugliosi and inspired him to later write a comprehensive book on the subject of the assassination. His 1,612-page book with a CD-ROM containing an additional 958 pages of endnotes and 170 pages of source notes, Reclaiming History: The Assassination of President John F. Kennedy, was published in May 2007. His book examined the JFK assassination in detail and drew on a variety of sources; his findings were in line with those of the Warren Report, which concluded that Oswald acted alone. He called Reclaiming History his "magnum opus". The book won the 2008 Edgar Award for Best Fact Crime.

A portion of the book was re-published in 2008 as Four Days in November: The Assassination of President John F. Kennedy, which became the basis of the 2013 film Parkland. The title of Reclaiming History derived from Bugliosi's belief that the history of the Kennedy assassination has been hijacked by JFK assassination conspiracy theories, the popularity of which he asserted had a pernicious and ongoing effect on American thought.

Unless this fraud is finally exposed, the word believe will be forgotten by future generations and John F. Kennedy will have unquestionably become the victim of a conspiracy. Belief will have become unchallenged fact, and the faith of the American people in their institutions further eroded. If that is allowed to happen, Lee Harvey Oswald, a man who hated his country and everything for which it stands, will have triumphed even beyond his intent on that fateful day in November.

— Vincent Bugliosi, Reclaiming History, p.1011.

=== Writing career ===
After leaving the district attorney's office, Bugliosi wrote, jointly with Curt Gentry, a book about the Manson trial called Helter Skelter (1974). The book won an Edgar Award from the Mystery Writers of America for the best true crime book of the year. It was adapted twice for television movies (one produced in 1976 and one in 2004). As of 2015, it is the best-selling true crime book in publishing history, with more than 7 million copies sold. Bugliosi wrote several other books, mostly dealing with well-known crimes. His works include And the Sea Will Tell (1991), which he wrote with Bruce Henderson about the murder case against Stephanie Stearns. It was a No. 1 New York Times bestselling book. He later wrote Reclaiming History: The Assassination of President John F. Kennedy (2007), in which he challenged numerous conspiracy theories and explored the events surrounding the assassination. He also wrote The Prosecution of George W. Bush for Murder (2008), a condemnation of former president George W. Bush's decision to invade Iraq.

==== Method of writing ====
Bugliosi did not own a computer and at one time did all his research through library microfilm archives. In his later years, he relied on his virtual secretary, Rosemary Newton, to help with these tasks. He also wrote his books entirely by hand, with Newton later transcribing his long-hand texts.

== Personal life ==
Bugliosi and his wife, Gail, had two children. Although raised Catholic, Bugliosi said later in life that he was an agnostic but was also open to the ideas of deism.

== Death ==
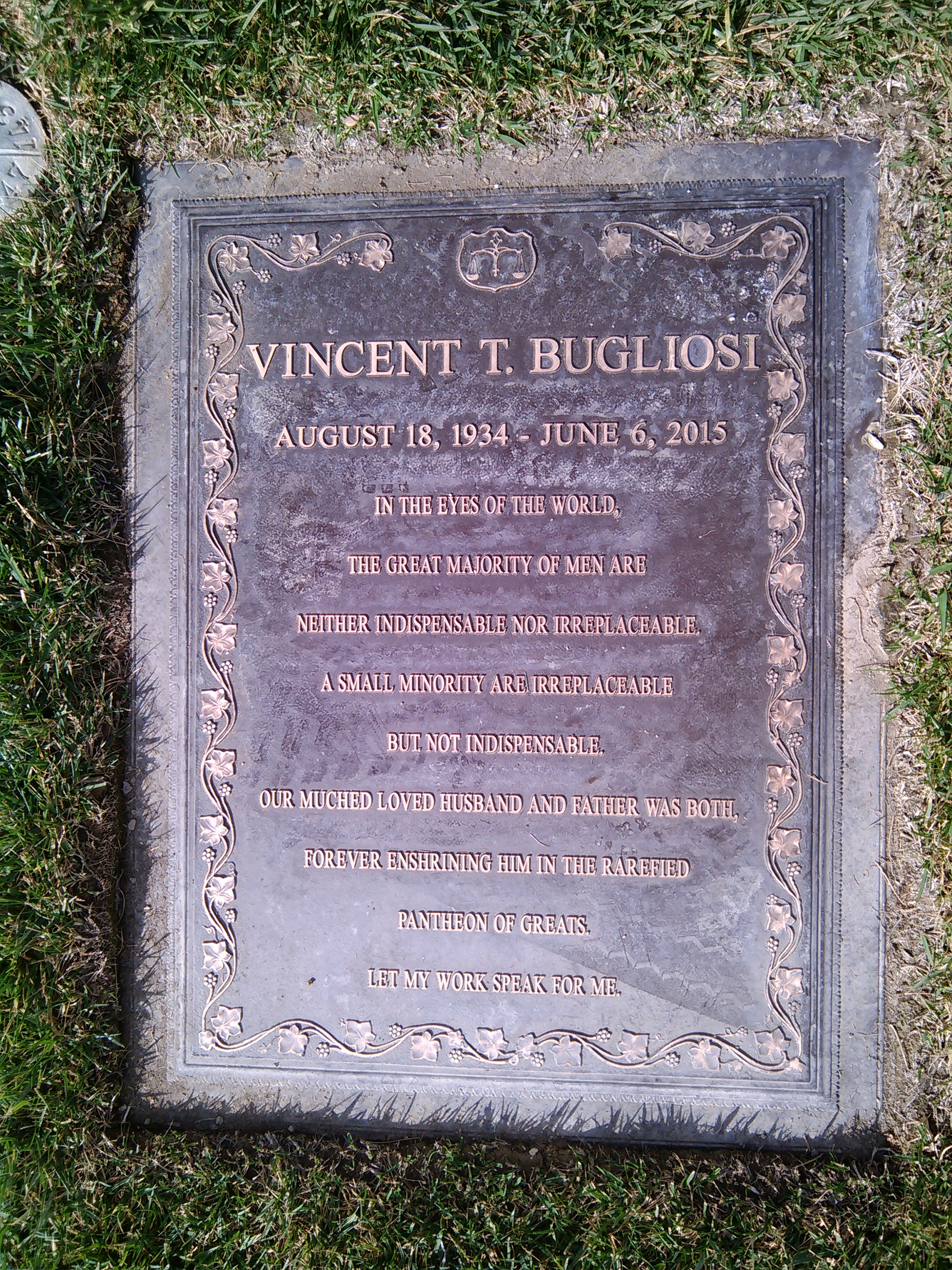
Bugliosi grave at Forest Lawn Memorial Park in Glendale, California

Bugliosi died of cancer at a Los Angeles hospital on June 6, 2015, at age 80. He is interred in the Forest Lawn Memorial Park in Glendale, California.

== Works ==
=== Books ===
- Helter Skelter: The True Story of The Manson Murders (with Curt Gentry) (1974) (Edgar Award, 1975, Best Fact Crime book)
- Till Death Us Do Part: A True Murder Mystery (with Ken Hurwitz) (1978) (Edgar Award, 1979, Best Fact Crime book)
- Shadow of Cain (with Ken Hurwitz) (1981)
- Lullaby and Good Night (with William Stadiem) (1987)
- Cleopatra: Biography (1988)
- Dinner with the Timbo: Getting to Know a Great Man (with Timothy Bishop) (1990)
- And the Sea Will Tell (with Bruce Henderson) (1991)
- Drugs in America: The Case for Victory - A Citizen's Call to Action (1991)
- The Phoenix Solution: Getting Serious About Winning America's Drug War (1996)
- Outrage: The Five Reasons Why O. J. Simpson Got Away with Murder (1996)
- No Island of Sanity: Paula Jones v. Bill Clinton—The Supreme Court on Trial (1998)
- The Betrayal of America: How the Supreme Court Undermined the Constitution and Chose Our President (2001)
- Reclaiming History: The Assassination of President John F. Kennedy (2007) (Edgar Award, 2008, Best Fact Crime book)
- The Prosecution of George W. Bush for Murder (2008)
- Four Days in November: The Assassination of President John F. Kennedy (2007)
- Divinity of Doubt: The God Question (2011)

=== In film and television ===
Many of Bugliosi's books have been adapted to the screen, and he appeared as a character in several of them.

- Helter Skelter 1976 (portrayed by George DiCenzo)
- On Trial: Lee Harvey Oswald (1986 TV film appearing as himself)
- And the Sea Will Tell 1991 TV film (portrayed by Richard Crenna)
- Till Death Us Do Part 1992 TV film (portrayed by Arliss Howard)
- Helter Skelter 2004 (portrayed by Bruno Kirby)

He also appeared as himself in the 1973 documentary film Manson.

=== Articles ===
- "No Justice, No Peace", Playboy, February, 1993.
- "None Dare Call It Treason", The Nation, February 5, 2001.
