= Ruth Ann Moorehouse =

Manson Family member

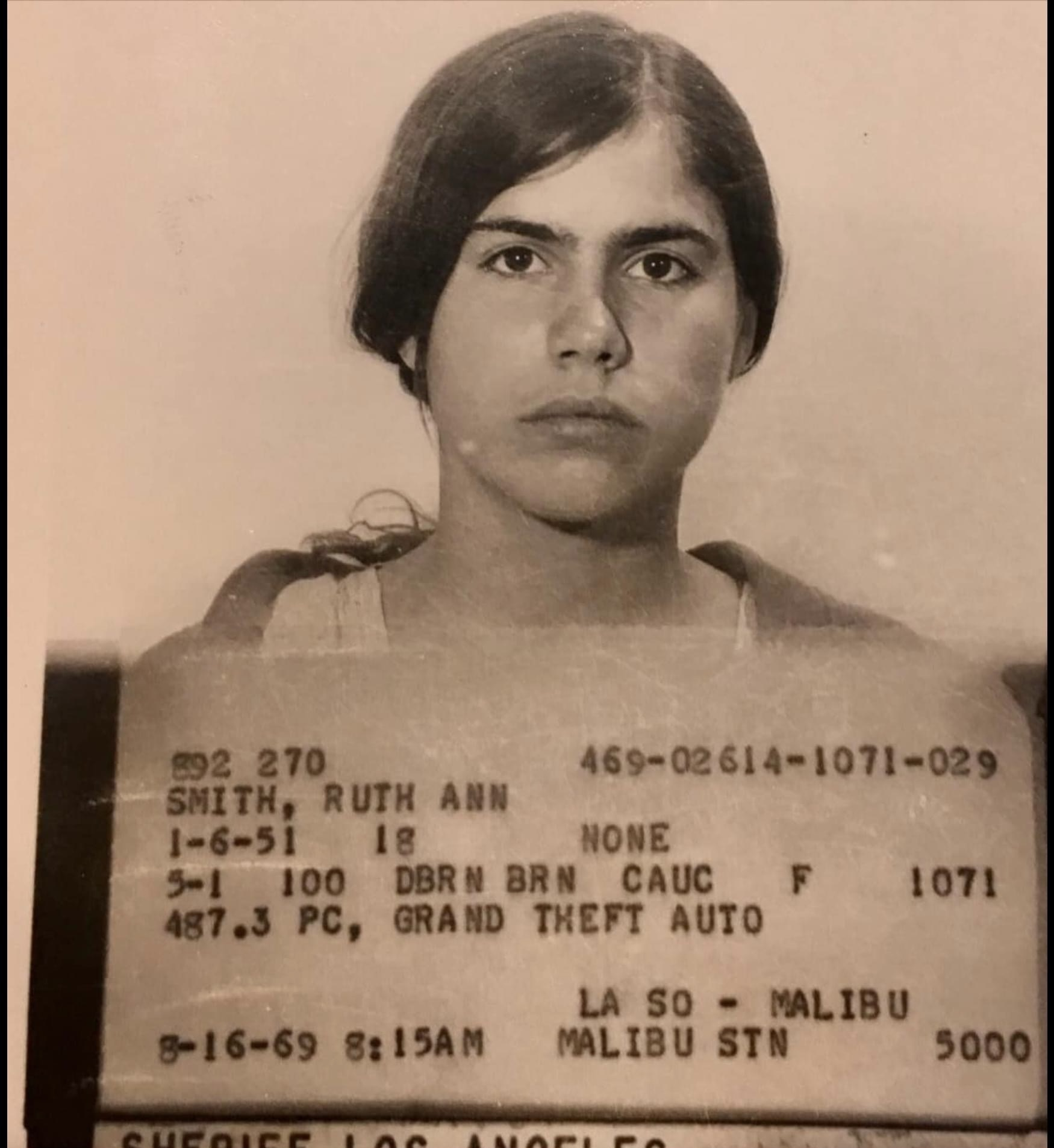
- Moorehouse's 1969 mugshot
- Born: January 6, 1953 (age 73); Toronto, Ontario, Canada
- Other names: Ouisch; Ruth Ann Smith; Ruth Ann Heuvelhorst; Ruth Ann Huevelhurst; Ruth Ann Huebelhurst; Ruth Ann Smack; Ruth Ann Fowler; Ruth Ann Geist; Rachel Susan Morse; Rachel Madison
- Known for: Former member of the Manson Family, attempted murder of Barbara Hoyt
- Spouses: Edward Lewis Heuvelhorst (m. 1968; div. 1968): Harold Irving Fowler (m. 1973; div. 197?); Dale Warren Geist (m. 1979; div. 1994)
- Children: 4

Ruth Ann Moorehouse (born January 6, 1953) is an American woman who is a former member of the Manson Family, led by Charles Manson. In December 1970, she, alongside Catherine Share, Lynette Fromme, Dennis Rice, and Steve Grogan were charged with attempted murder after they plotted to murder former fellow Manson Family member Barbara Hoyt to prevent her from testifying for the prosecution against Manson, Susan Atkins, Leslie Van Houten, and Patricia Krenwinkel during the Tate–LaBianca murder trial. The charge was later reduced to conspiracy to dissuade a witness from testifying. While her accomplices served a 90-day sentence at the Los Angeles County Jail, Moorehouse never served her sentence, as she failed to appear at the sentencing hearing. In October 1975, she was arrested on the 4-year-old warrant for conspiring to dissuade Hoyt from testifying. However, the following month the county judge ruled that she would not receive a prison sentence as he was satisfied that she had disassociated herself from the Manson Family.

== Early life ==
Ruth Ann Moorehouse was born on January 6, 1953, in Toronto, Ontario, Canada, the fourth and youngest child to former Protestant minister Dean Allen Moorehouse, who had been born in North Dakota, and Audrey Lucille Sirpless, who was originally from Minnesota. She had three siblings; sister Kathleen, brother Dean Thomas and sister Sharon, all of whom were born in Minnesota. The family is of English, Scottish, Irish, Scotch-Irish, German, and French descent. Moorehouse attended Westmont High School in Campbell, California, and Leggett Valley High School in Leggett, California, where she was a part of the student council. Her parents divorced in August 1967 after her mother, Audrey, had grown uncomfortable with her husband Dean's friendship with Charles Manson, and went to live with her sister.

== Involvement with the Manson Family ==
=== Meeting Charles Manson ===
In 1967, Ruth's father Dean Moorehouse befriended Charles Manson after he had picked Manson up as a hitchhiker. Moorehouse invited Manson to dinner at his San Jose home, which resulted in Manson spending the night. The two discussed the Bible and sang religious songs. Manson was fond of the piano that the Moorehouse family owned, which Dean Moorehouse allowed Manson to take for himself. Dean Moorehouse told Manson that he was always welcome in his home, and Manson became a frequent visitor. He soon took interest in Ruth Ann, who was 14 years old at the time, and took Ruth Ann on a trip up the coast in his Volkswagen Microbus, which he had recently acquired from a neighbor of the Moorehouses' in exchange for their piano.

This resulted in Dean and Audrey reporting Ruth Ann as a runaway, and the pair were apprehended by Sheriff's deputies on July 28, 1967. Ruth Ann was returned home and Manson was arrested for trying to interfere with the police. On May 20, 1968, Ruth Ann Moorehouse married twenty-three-year-old bus driver Edward Lewis Heuvelhorst in Santa Cruz in an effort to become emancipated from her father, which Manson had advised her to do. According to Moorehouse, the marriage only lasted one day, and she moved to the Los Angeles area where Manson and his followers had relocated months earlier.

=== Dennis Wilson and Terry Melcher ===
Dean Moorehouse learned of this, which resulted in him meeting Manson at Dennis Wilson's house, where Manson kneeled down and kissed Moorehouse’s toes, welcoming him to the party and introducing him to LSD. Dean spent the rest of the summer at Wilson's house living in the guesthouse in exchange for taking care of the landscaping. He became a devout follower of Manson, and spent a brief amount of time with the Manson Family at Spahn Ranch after they began living there in the summer of 1968. A different account says Manson, Lynnette Fromme, and Mary Brunner visited the Moorehouse home, where Dean Moorehouse chased Manson outside, threatening him for having sex with Ruth Ann. He cornered Manson with a shotgun, to which Manson responded by putting his hand on Moorehouse's shoulder and saying, "love is so much better than anger, and what a relief it was when you gave up your individuality and became part of a real family."

Record producer Terry Melcher, who Manson had befriended, took a liking to Ruth Ann and began an affair with her. He attempted to employ her as a housekeeper at his 10050 Cielo Drive home, which Candice Bergen, his girlfriend, disapproved of.

=== Spahn Ranch and Barker Ranch ===
While living at Spahn Ranch, Moorehouse was responsible for taking care of the children, dumpster diving, and panhandling. She acquired her nickname "Ouisch" from George Spahn, although there are different theories as to what the nickname meant. One theory is that it was because of the sound that her pants made when she walked by, another is because it was the whistling sound men made when she walked past them. In April 1969, George Spahn agreed to act as Moorehouse's foster parent after she was arrested and placed in juvenile hall.

A week after the Tate–LaBianca murders, Moorehouse was arrested with the family in the August 16, 1969, Spahn Ranch raid as "suspects in a major auto theft ring" that had been stealing Volkswagen Beetles and converting them into dune buggies. Weapons were seized, but, because the search warrant had the wrong date on it, the group was released a few days later. Months later at the Myers Ranch in Death Valley, Susan Atkins told Moorehouse about the murders of coffee heiress Abigail Folger and pregnant actress Sharon Tate. Moorehouse allegedly responded with laughter and told Atkins she couldn't wait to get her first “pig”. Moorehouse later told Barbara Hoyt that she knew of ten more murders other than Tate.

Moorehouse was again arrested with the family in the October 10, 1969 Barker Ranch raid. Moorehouse later recalled, "Just before we got busted in the desert, there was twelve of us apostles and Charlie [Manson]."

=== Tate–LaBianca trials ===
After being released from jail, Moorehouse briefly lived with her mother in Minnesota. During the Tate-LaBianca murder trial, she reconnected with the Manson Family, and became a regular fixture outside of the Los Angeles courthouse and carved an "X" into her forehead alongside other family members to signify that they “had ‘X'd’ themselves from our world,” as Manson had said. While being questioned by authorities, Moorehouse remained loyal to the family and claimed that she did not know anything about the murders.

==== Hawaiian burger incident ====
In 1970, Vincent Bugliosi wanted Hoyt to testify against the Manson Family, and she was scheduled to take the stand in September. Under pressure from the Family, who were urging her to stay loyal to them, she took a vacation to Hawaii with Moorehouse. According to Ed Sanders, Steve Grogan drove Hoyt and Moorehouse to Dennis Rice's house. Rice bought them plane tickets, gave them money and credit cards, and drove them to the airport. Using the names Amy Riley and Jill Morgan, Hoyt and Moorehouse flew to Honolulu.

On September 9, Moorehouse told Hoyt that she had to go back to California, but that Hoyt was to stay behind in Hawaii. While at the airport, Hoyt ordered a hamburger. According to Hoyt, when it arrived, Moorehouse took it and went outside, while Hoyt paid for it. When she came out, Moorehouse gave her the hamburger, and Hoyt ate it while they were waiting for Moorehouse's flight. Just before she was to board, Hoyt said that Moorehouse remarked, ‘Imagine what it would be like if that hamburger had ten tabs of acid in it.’ After Moorehouse left, according to Hoyt, she “then went into the city. All of a sudden I was feeling really weird, very high, and I realized there were ten tabs of acid in the hamburger. I got to a bathroom and made myself throw up. I don't know how I did it, but I got to the steps of the Salvation Army building… A man asked me, ‘Are you all right?’ I said no. I told him to call Mr. Bugliosi. They took me to a hospital and gave me Valium by IV to bring me down…. That's when I lost consciousness. Even though they tried to kill me, I had to testify. I'd seen Sharon Tate's mother on TV talking about her grief. That's what swayed me… What it finally came down to for me was this: Did I want to be able to live with myself when I got old? I decided that I did.”

On December 18, 1970, Moorehouse, Rice, Grogan, Fromme, and Catherine Share were charged with attempted murder of Hoyt. On February 26, 1971, a heavily pregnant Moorehouse appeared on the witness stand during the Tate-LaBianca murder trial, where Vincent Bugliosi cross-examined her. She was also questioned by Manson's attorney, Irving Kanarek, and said that Manson was at a waterfall several miles from the Spahn Ranch on the night of the Tate murders.

On March 23, 1971, Moorehouse, Share, Fromme, Grogan, and Rice were allowed to plead no contest to the lesser charge of conspiracy to dissuade a witness, and the murder counts were dropped. The following month, Share, Fromme, Grogan, and Rice were sentenced to 90 days in jail for conspiracy to dissuade a witness; Moorehouse did not appear at the sentencing hearing, and fled the state to go live with her sister in Carson City, Nevada. On April 10, 1971, Moorehouse gave birth to a daughter named LaDieh Fawn, and returned to her mother's home in Minnesota.

== After the Manson Family ==
On October 6, 1972, Moorehouse married construction worker Harold Irving Fowler in Reno, and the following year their daughter was born. In 1975, the FBI located Moorehouse living in Sacramento, where she had been residing since August 1974. They informed Sacramento authorities, who arrested her in October of that year on the 4-year-old warrant for attempting to murder Hoyt. Her bond was set at $1,000, and she was released later that day after a family member posted the bond. A week later, Moorehouse appeared in court with her lawyer Fitzgerald, who said, "The 'family' told her she had to shave her head and that she had to have her baby in jail, and she wanted none of that." Fitzgerald also claimed that Moorehouse did not appear at the sentencing hearing because she was nine months pregnant at the time, and that Fromme and Sandra Good had been harassing Moorehouse's sister in Nevada and urging Ruth Ann to return to the Family. On November 4, the judge ruled that because she was abandoned by her father and “thrown willy-nilly into the Manson cult” she could go free with no time served.

In 1975, Moorehouse underwent plastic surgery to remove the "X" from her forehead. She moved to Minnesota, and married for a third time, to Dale Warren Geist, in 1979. In 1981, her daughter died at the age of seven.

== In popular culture ==
The character "Pussycat", portrayed by Margaret Qualley in Quentin Tarantino's Once Upon a Time in Hollywood (2019), is based on Moorehouse and Kathryn "Kitty" Lutesinger, another Manson Family member. The character also appears in Tarantino's debut novel of the same name, which is an adaptation of the film.
