= Lancer (TV series) =

American Western television series (1968–1970)

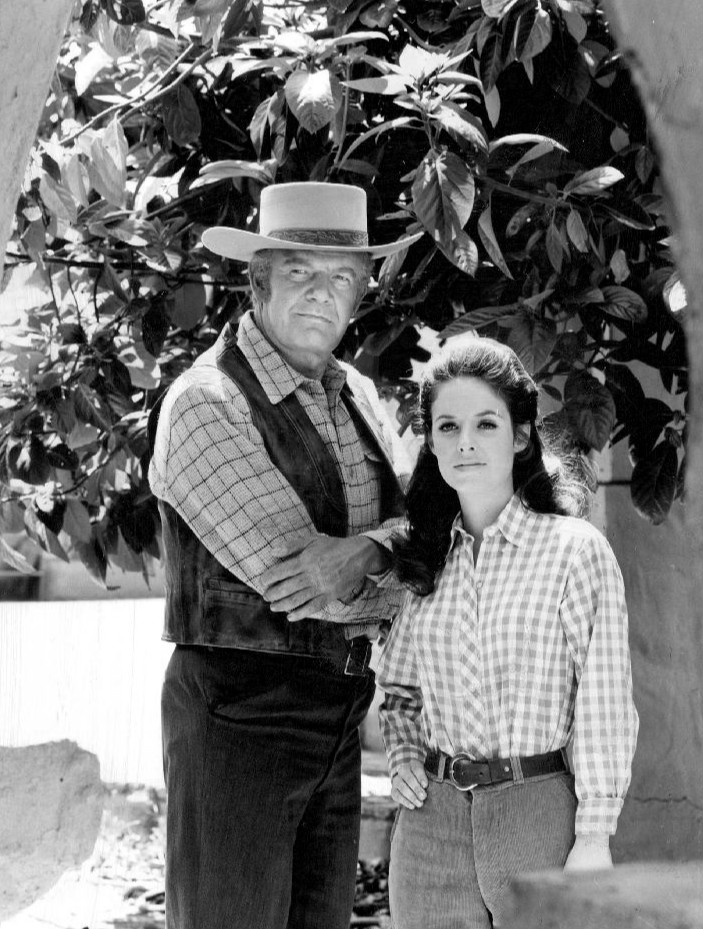
- Andrew Duggan and Elizabeth Baur, 1968
- Genre: Western
- Created by: Samuel A. Peeples
- Directed by: Various
- Starring: James Stacy; Wayne Maunder; Andrew Duggan; Elizabeth Baur
- Theme music composer: Jerome Moross
- Composers: Jerome Moross; Sidney Fine; Hugo Friedhofer; Robert Drasnin; Leith Stevens; Joseph Mullendore; Irving Gertz; Fred Steiner; Alexander Courage; Harry Geller; Arthur Morton; George Duning
- Country of origin: United States
- Original language: English
- No. of seasons: 2
- No. of episodes: 51

Production
- Producers: Sam Wanamaker (pilot episode); Alan A. Armer; George Amy; Edwin Self
- Camera setup: Single-camera
- Running time: 48 mins.
- Production company: 20th Century-Fox Television

Original release
- Network: CBS
- Release: September 24, 1968 – June 23, 1970

Lancer is an American Western television series that aired Tuesdays at 7:30 pm (Eastern Time) on CBS from September 24, 1968, to June 23, 1970. The series stars Andrew Duggan as a father with two half-brother sons, played by James Stacy and Wayne Maunder.

== Synopsis ==
Duggan starred as Murdoch Lancer, the patriarch of the Lancer family. Maunder played Scott Lancer, the educated older son and a veteran of the Union Army. Stacy played gunslinger Johnny Madrid Lancer. Paul Brinegar appeared as Jelly Hoskins and Elizabeth Baur played Murdoch Lancer's ward Teresa O'Brien. The sons were half-brothers from Murdoch Lancer's two marriages, and neither of them remembered him when he brought them in to defend against outlaws who were attacking his cattle empire.

Lancer lasted for 51 hour-long episodes and was shot in color. It was rerun on CBS May 1971 - September 1971 on Thursdays from 8 to 9 p.m. E. T.

== Guest stars ==
Guest stars included Joe Don Baker, Noah Beery, Jr., Scott Brady, Ellen Corby, Rick Dalton, Bruce Dern, Jack Elam, Sam Elliott, Harper Flaherty, Beverly Garland, Kevin Hagen, Ron Howard, Wright King, Cloris Leachman, Barbara Luna, George Macready, John McKee, Warren Oates, Stefanie Powers, Tom Selleck, Bill Mumy, and William Tannen.

== Episodes ==
=== Season 1 (1968–69) ===
No. overall	No. in season	Title	Directed by	Written by	Original release date
1	1	"The High Riders"	Sam Wanamaker	T : Dean Riesner; S : Samuel A. Peeples	September 24, 1968
2	2	"Blood Rock"	Gene Nelson	Jack Turley	October 1, 1968
3	3	"Chase a Wild Horse"	Walter Grauman	Paul Playdon	October 8, 1968
4	4	"Foley"	Alex Singer	S : Brian McKay; S/T : Anthony Spinner	October 15, 1968
5	5	"The Lawman"	Allen Reisner	Laurence Heath	October 22, 1968
6	6	"Julie"	Alex Singer	S : Don Brinkley; S/T : Paul Playdon	October 29, 1968
7	7	"The Prodigal"	Sobey Martin	S : Mel Goldberg; S/T : D. C. Fontana	November 12, 1968
8	8	"Jelly"	Sobey Martin	Jack Turley	November 19, 1968
9	9	"The Last Train for Charlie Poe"	Don Richardson	Carey Wilber	November 26, 1968
10	10	"Glory"	Gene Nelson	Jack Turley	December 10, 1968
11	11	"The Heart of Pony Alice"	Christian I. Nyby II	Ken Trevey	December 17, 1968
12	12	"The Escape"	William Hale	Anthony Spinner	December 31, 1968
13	13	"The Wedding"	Sobey Martin	Anthony Spinner	January 7, 1969
14	14	"Death Bait"	Robert Butler	Jack Turley	January 14, 1969
15	15	"The Black McGloins"	Don Richardson	Carey Wilber	January 21, 1969
16	16	"Yesterday's Vendetta"	Otto Lang	Don Brinkley	January 28, 1969
17	17	"Warburton's Edge"	Don Medford	S : K. C. Alison; S/T : Ken Trevey	February 4, 1969
18	18	"The Fix-It Man"	William Hale	Charles Wallace	February 11, 1969
19	19	"Angel Day and Her Sunshine Girls"	Don Richardson	Jack Turley	February 25, 1969
20	20	"The Great Humbug"	William Hale	Carey Wilber	March 4, 1969
21	21	"Juniper's Camp"	William Hale	Barry Oringer	March 11, 1969
22	22	"The Knot"	Don Richardson	Laurence Heath	March 18, 1969
23	23	"The Man Without a Gun"	Don Richardson	Roland Wolpert	March 25, 1969
24	24	"Child of Rock and Sunlight"	Don Richardson	Penrod Smith	April 1, 1969
25	25	"The Measure of a Man"	Don McDougall	Gerry Day	April 8, 1969
26	26	"Devil's Blessing"	Christian I. Nyby II	Sam Roeca	April 22, 1969

=== Season 2 (1969–70) ===
No. overall	No. in season	Title	Directed by	Written by	Original release date
27	1	"Blind Man's Bluff"	Leo Penn	Carey Wilber	September 23, 1969
28	2	"Zee"	Leo Penn	S : Mitchell Lindemann; S/T : Andy Lewis	September 30, 1969
29	3	"The Kid"	Allen Reisner	Carey Wilber	October 7, 1969
30	4	"The Black Angel"	Allen Reisner	Jack Turley	October 21, 1969
31	5	"The Gifts"	Allen Reisner	S : D. C. Fontana; S/T : Andy White	October 28, 1969
32	6	"Cut the Wolf Loose"	Robert Day	Ken Trevey	November 4, 1969
33	7	"Jelly Hoskins' American Dream"	Christian I. Nyby II	Andy White	November 11, 1969
34	8	"Welcome to Genesis"	Robert Day	Ken Pettus	November 18, 1969
35	9	"A Person Unknown"	William Hale	Andy Lewis	November 25, 1969
36	10	"Legacy"	Christian I. Nyby II	Jack Turley	December 9, 1969
37	11	"A Scarecrow at Hacket's"	Marvin Chomsky	Sam Roeca	December 16, 1969
38	12	"Little Darling of the Sierras"	Allen Reisner	Ken Trevey	December 30, 1969
39	13	"Shadow of a Dead Man"	Robert Butler	Jack Turley	January 6, 1970
40	14	"Blue Skies for Willie Sharpe"	Allen Reisner	Andy White	January 13, 1970
41	15	"Chad"	Alan A. Armer	Carey Wilber	January 20, 1970
42	16	"The Lorelei"	Christian I. Nyby II	Sam Roeca	January 27, 1970
43	17	"The Lion and the Lamb"	Allen Reisner	Andy White	February 3, 1970
44	18	"The Experiment"	Virgil W. Vogel	Herbert Purdum	February 17, 1970
45	19	"Splinter Group"	Virgil W. Vogel	Sam Roeca	March 3, 1970
46	20	"Lamp in the Wilderness"	Michael Caffey	Andy White	March 10, 1970
47	21	"The Buscaderos"	Allen Reisner	T : Ken Trevey; S : Jim Byrnes	March 17, 1970
48	22	"Dream of Falcons"	Don Richardson	Carey Wilber	April 7, 1970
49	23	"Goodbye, Lizzie"	Allen Reisner	Kathleen Hite	April 28, 1970
50	24	"The Rivals"	Christian I. Nyby II	Thomas Thompson	May 5, 1970
51	25	"Lifeline"	Robert Butler	Sam Roeca	May 19, 1970

== Production ==
Samuel Peeples created the series, and Alan A. Armer produced it for 20th Century-Fox. The pilot episode, "The High Riders", was mostly filmed on location in and around the hacienda now located within the Santa Lucia Preserve. All interior shots of the hacienda in subsequent episodes were filmed on a sound stage in Hollywood, recreated from photographs of the original.

== In popular culture ==
The film Once Upon a Time in Hollywood (2019) incorporates a fictionalized account of the filming of Lancer's pilot episode, depicting fictional actor Rick Dalton (Leonardo DiCaprio) appearing as a villain in the episode. Director Sam Wanamaker and series stars James Stacy and Wayne Maunder are depicted. Additional scenes are featured in the novelization of Once Upon a Time in Hollywood, as well depicting other actors, including Andrew Duggan.
