= Catherine Share =

Convicted member of the Manson Family (born 1942)

- Born: Catherine Louise Share; December 10, 1942 (age 83); Paris, France
- Other name: Gypsy
- Known for: Former member of the Manson Family
- Status: Sentences completed
- Convictions: 1970: conspiracy to dissuade a witness from testifying 1971: armed robbery 1979: mail fraud (6 counts), interstate transportation of stolen property, fraudulent use of a credit card
- Penalty: 1970: 90 days 1971: 5 years 1979: ?

Catherine Louise "Gypsy" Share (born December 10, 1942) is an American criminal who is known as a former member of the Manson Family; she was convicted of witness intimidation in relation to the 1970 trial of the Tate-LaBianca murders. In 1971 she was convicted of armed robbery and served five years. Share was not directly involved in the Tate-LaBianca murders, for which Charles Manson and some of his followers were convicted and originally sentenced to death. She served 90 days for witness intimidation.

Following her release from prison in 1975, Share disassociated herself from the "Family". She has spoken publicly about her experiences with them.

== Early life ==
Share was born in Paris in 1942, to refugee parents, a Hungarian violinist father and a German Jewish mother. Her parents were members of the French Resistance movement during World War II, and committed suicide when their daughter was two. Share's paternal grandmother died in a ghetto in Eastern Europe and both of Share's maternal grandparents died in concentration camps. Before her parents' suicides, her father had made arrangements with a French lawyer, who was secretly helping the underground, to plan his daughter's escape from France.

Through her father's arrangements, Share was to be adopted by an American couple. Before she reached the United States, the couple divorced due to the husband's infidelity. They went to court, and adoptive mother, Patricia Jeanne Johnston, was awarded custody. Johnston later married American psychologist Sidney Share, who also adopted the girl. The couple relocated to Hollywood, California.

She graduated from Hollywood High School in 1961. According to Share, her childhood was relatively happy until her adoptive mother was diagnosed with cancer and committed suicide in 1959, when Share was 16. Share continued to live with her adoptive father Sidney Share, who was blind. After he remarried when Share was in college, she dropped out and began wandering California. She became immersed in the 1960s counterculture.

== Counterculture ==
In 1965, Catherine Share recorded a single as Charity Shane for the Autumn Records label in San Francisco. The company had gained some success with The Beau Brummels. In 1996 the recording was issued in the UK on the Ace/Big Beat compilation CD Someone to Love.

== Involvement with the Manson Family ==
In early 1967, Share met Bobby Beausoleil on the set of a softcore porn movie entitled The Ramrodder. She began an affair with the aspiring musician. After meeting Charles Manson through Beausoleil, she moved to the "Family" location on Spahn's Ranch. They used her adopted nickname of "Gypsy", which she had taken after meeting a man named Gypsy. They shared a birthday and she believed he was her cosmic twin.

=== Tate-LaBianca ===
Although not directly involved in the Tate-LaBianca murders, Share testified at the 1970 trial of defendants in these murders. She said that Family member Linda Kasabian was the mastermind. She was trying to absolve Manson of any involvement in the crimes.

On December 18, 1970, Share, along with four other Manson followers: Lynette "Squeaky" Fromme, Dennis Rice, Steve "Clem" Grogan, and Ruth Ann "Ouisch" Moorehouse, were charged with attempted murder after they plotted to kill former fellow Manson Family member Barbara Hoyt. They had wanted to prevent her from testifying for the prosecution against Manson, Susan Atkins, Leslie Van Houten, and Patricia Krenwinkel during the Tate/LaBianca murder trial.

They planned for Moorehouse to lure Hoyt to Honolulu, Hawaii, so that she would be unable to testify. If she could not persuade Hoyt against testifying, Moorehouse was to kill her. After they visited, on September 9, 1970 Hoyt prepared to board a flight back to California. Moorehouse bought Hoyt a hamburger and laced it with a large dose of LSD. Moorehouse left Hoyt at the airport and flew back to California alone. Hoyt survived this attempt on her life, and Share and the others were charged with attempted murder. The charge was later reduced to conspiracy to dissuade a witness from testifying. Share, Fromme, Rice, and Grogan served 90-day sentences at the Los Angeles County Jail. Moorehouse never served her sentence, as she failed to appear at the sentencing hearing.

While incarcerated, Share gave birth to a son, Phoenix, on January 5, 1971. The baby was taken from her and placed into foster care. After being released from prison, she was able to be reunited with Phoenix.

On August 21, 1971, Share, accompanied by Family members Kenneth Como, Mary Brunner, Dennis Rice, Charles Lovett, and Larry Bailey, drove a van to a Hawthorne, California Western Surplus Store. Inside they brandished guns and ordered store patrons and clerks to lie on the floor. They took 143 rifles from the premises, and loaded them into the van, while a store clerk tripped the silent alarm. (The group had previously held up a liquor store.) When a police squad car arrived, Share opened fire on the vehicle, hitting the windshield. Police returned gunfire, which wounded Brunner, Share, and Bailey. Police arrested all five for the armed robbery. In addition, they alleged that they planned to hijack a Boeing 747 and threaten to kill one passenger each hour until Manson and fellow Family members were released from prison.

Brunner and Share were convicted of armed robbery and sentenced to prison; they were assigned to California Institution for Women. There they were held in the special unit that had been created as a death row for Family members Leslie Van Houten, Susan Atkins, and Patricia Krenwinkel. These three had been sentenced to death for their involvement in the Tate-LaBianca murders. Their sentences were later commuted to life imprisonment after the Supreme Court ruled in 1972 that existing statutes about the death sentence were unconstitutional.

== After the Manson Family ==
Share served five years for the Hawthorne shootout and was released in 1975. Share married Kenneth Como in 1976. Following her release, Share disassociated herself from the "Family". During Manson's 1970 trial, Share and other "Family" members each carved an "X" on their foreheads, on Manson's orders. In the documentary Helter Skelter: An American Myth (2020), Share said she had removed the symbol.

In 1979, Share was convicted in absentia in California on six counts of mail fraud, interstate transportation of stolen property, and fraudulent use of a credit card. Share had initially fled to Canada, but voluntarily returned to the United States to serve her sentence.

Interest in the Manson Family has been periodically revived. In July 2006, Share returned to the remnants of Spahn Ranch to be interviewed by The History Channel about her role in the Manson Family. This was for the series Our Generation. Similarly, in 2007, Share was interviewed about her years with the Family by forensic psychologist Michael H. Stone for the American television series Most Evil, on the Investigation Discovery network.

Share became a born-again Christian later in life. She has been a public speaker, advocating against cults. According to the Library of Congress, she sold her memoir She was a Gypsy Woman to Paramount Vantage in 2008.

== In popular culture ==
In addition to being featured in interviews, Share was portrayed by Lena Dunham in Quentin Tarantino's Once Upon a Time in Hollywood (2019), a drama about this period.
