= Once Upon a Time in Hollywood (novel) =

2021 novel by Quentin Tarantino

Once Upon a Time in Hollywood: A Novel
- First edition cover
- Author: Quentin Tarantino
- Audio read by: Jennifer Jason Leigh
- Language: English
- Subjects: Classical Hollywood cinema; New Hollywood
- Genre: Novelization; Hollywood novel
- Publisher: HarperCollins/Harper Perennial
- Publication date: June 29, 2021
- Publication place: United States
- Media type: Print (paperback, hardcover), e-book, audiobook
- Pages: 400
- ISBN: 9780063112520 (paperback)

Once Upon a Time in Hollywood: A Novel is the 2021 debut novel by Quentin Tarantino. It is a novelization of his 2019 film Once Upon a Time in Hollywood. Like the film, it follows the career arc of fictional action movie star Rick Dalton and his friend and stunt double, Cliff Booth. According to Tarantino, the novel is "a complete rethinking of the entire story" and adds details to various sequences and characters, including multiple chapters dedicated to the backstory of Booth. It debuted at number one on The New York Times' fiction best-seller list.

== Differences from film ==
The film's finale occurs towards the beginning of the novel, and its aftermath includes Rick Dalton earning newfound fame as a regular on The Tonight Show Starring Johnny Carson.

It also focuses on Charles Manson's pursuit of a music career and the "inner worlds" of Sharon Tate and Trudi Frazer. There is a chapter dedicated to the Manson Family's "creepy crawls". In it, Manson instructs "Pussycat" to break into a wealthy, elderly couple's house while they are sleeping.

Tarantino explains the inner thoughts of the controversial Bruce Lee–Cliff Booth fight, saying that Booth tricks Lee into the fight and Booth is fighting his own instinct to murder Lee more than Lee himself.

The novel includes several chapters on the backstory of Lancer and its lead actor, James Stacy.

It also contains a chapter detailing how Booth came to own his pit bull, Brandy, and another chapter focused on Booth living in France after escaping from a Filipino jungle as a POW. Tarantino based the Brandy and POW chapters on true stories.

Critique is given on a large amount of mid-century films and filmmakers through the minds of Tate, Dalton, and Booth.

The final part of the novel involves a phone call between Rick Dalton and Trudi Frazer on the evening after their day shooting Lancer together. They do a line reading and reminisce about the day and Trudi reminds Dalton how lucky they are to do what they do, making him genuinely realize "for the first time in ten years... how fortunate he is and was." The scene was cut from the film for reasons of pacing and timing.

== Publication ==
In November 2020, Tarantino signed a two-book deal with HarperCollins. On June 29, 2021, he published his first novel, an adaptation of Once Upon a Time in Hollywood in paperback, eBook, and digital audio editions. A deluxe hardcover was released on November 9, 2021. The deluxe edition contains Once Upon a Time in Hollywood memorabilia, including a script for an episode of Rick Dalton's Bounty Law, entitled Incident at Inez written by Tarantino. Tarantino stated: "In the seventies movie novelizations were the first adult books I grew up reading ... And to this day I have a tremendous amount of affection for the genre."

The audiobook is narrated by Jennifer Jason Leigh, who previously starred in Tarantino's The Hateful Eight. According to Tarantino, her Hateful Eight character Daisy Domergue was "A Manson girl out west, like Susan Atkins or something." On June 21, 2021, a trailer for the novel was released, containing never before seen footage from the film and narrated by Kurt Russell, who was also the film's narrator.

== Characters ==
Many fictional and historical characters appear in Once Upon a Time in Hollywood, including Bruce Lee, Steve McQueen, and members of the Manson Family. Other characters who appear in the novel include:

- Aldo Ray — an actor with a chapter titled and dedicated to him.
- Curtis Zastoupil — Tarantino's step-father and a pianist who plays at a bar that Rick Dalton, Cliff Booth and James Stacy frequent after Dalton's day on Lancer. Zastoupil obtains Dalton's autograph for a six-year-old Tarantino.
- Dennis Wilson — The drummer for the rock band The Beach Boys.
- Terry Melcher — The son of Doris Day and record producer for Columbia Records.
- Candice Bergen — An actress and girlfriend of Melcher who lived with him on Cielo Drive.
- Gregg Jakobson — A songwriter who worked for Melcher and became close with the Manson Family. He frequently recorded Manson's music.
- Andrew Duggan — The actor who portrayed Murdoch Lancer on the TV series Lancer, whose character seeks out his two estranged sons from different mothers, to help save his ranch from the land pirates.
- Caleb DeCoteau — The fictional lead villain and leader of the land pirates on the pilot episode of Lancer, portrayed by Rick Dalton.
- Jim Brown — An actor and NFL star. While Brown is in Spain shooting 100 Rifles, Cliff Booth becomes known as "the only white man to ever win a fistfight with Jim Brown."
- Ace Woody — A rodeo cowboy who gives Sharon Tate a ride from her hometown of Dallas, Texas to New Mexico on her way to Los Angeles.
- Janet Himmelsteen, introduced as Miss Himmelsteen is the secretary of Marvin Schwarz, Dalton's agent at the William Morris Agency. She goes on a date with Booth and in 1972 becomes an agent at William Morris. By 1975, she becomes one of their top agents.

Other historical figures who appear as characters or are mentioned include

- Warren Beatty
- Jean-Paul Belmondo
- Joan Bennett
- Marlon Brando
- Charles Bronson
- Michael Callan
- Yakima Canutt
- David Carradine
- George Chakiris
- James Coburn
- Sergio Corbucci
- Joseph Cotten
- George Cukor
- Dino De Laurentiis
- Pete Duel
- Anita Ekberg
- Ron Ely
- John English
- Mel Ferrer
- Henry Fonda
- Glenn Ford
- John Ford
- Fabian Forte
- Farley Granger
- Stewart Granger
- George Hamilton
- Charlton Heston
- Craig Hill
- Glynis Johns
- Harmon Jones
- Elia Kazan
- Jennings Lang
- Tom Laughlin
- Sergio Leone
- Gina Lollobrigida
- Jack Lord
- George Maharis
- Quinn Martin
- Lee Marvin
- Gardner McKay
- Ralph Meeker
- Toshiro Mifune
- Robert Mitchum
- Vic Morrow
- Paul Newman
- George Peppard
- Edward G. Robinson
- Stirling Silliphant
- R. G. Springsteen
- John Sturges
- Russ Tamblyn
- Robert Taylor
- Rod Taylor
- Lee Van Cleef
- Walter Wanger
- Paul Wendkos
- Richard Widmark
- Van Williams
- Robert Wise
- William Witney
- Neil Young
- Efrem Zimbalist Jr.

== Reception ==
=== Critical response ===
Dwight Garner of The New York Times said: "[Tarantino is] not out to impress us with the intricacy of his sentences. [...] He's here to tell a story in take-it-or-leave-it Elmore Leonard fashion. [...] He gets it." Peter Bradshaw of The Guardian wrote: "Tarantino made a career alchemising movie trash into gold [...] Now he's done the same with ... the pulpiest of pulp fiction. [...] The book is entirely outrageous and addictively readable on its own terms." Charles Arrowsmith of The Washington Post praised the novel's "authentically pulpy atmosphere" and Tarantino's "explosive dialogue" as being "almost as effective written down as read aloud." Neal Pollack described the Lancer chapters as though "you've landed in a Louis L'Amour novel."

Katie Rosseinsky of the Evening Standard wrote: "It's hard to escape the feeling that Tarantino is writing his own fanfiction – albeit with undeniable flair." Kayleigh Donaldson of Pajiba said: "Tarantino's skills are not best suited to the form of the novel... It's almost fascinating how [the novel] makes the film less interesting."

=== Sales ===
Upon publication, it became the number one selling book on Amazon. The novel debuted at number one on The New York Times fiction best-seller list in its first week.

=== Accolades ===
On September 1, 2021, Quentin Tarantino won the 2021 Writer of the Year GQ Men of the Year award for Once Upon a Time in Hollywood.

== Music ==
The novel contains printed lyrics of five credited songs not heard in the film with the permission of Hal Leonard LLC.

== Sequel ==
In June 2021, Tarantino revealed he wrote a complementary novel about the films of Rick Dalton, which he plans to publish.
