= Alan Armer =

American television writer, producer, and director

Alan A. Armer (July 7, 1922 – December 5, 2010) was an American television producer, best known for his Emmy Award winning tenure as the producer of The Fugitive. He also produced The Invaders, The Untouchables and the first year of Cannon.

== Early life and education ==
Armer was born in Los Angeles, the son of Mr. and Mrs. Joseph Armer. He was an announcer for Armed Forces Radio while serving in the U. S. Army in Ceylon and India during World War II. He received a bachelor's degree in speech and drama from Stanford University in 1947 and a master's degree in theatre arts from UCLA.

== Career ==
After college, Armer started his entertainment career at a radio station in San Jose where he worked as an announcer. After moving back to Los Angeles in search of a radio job, Armer began working at an advertising agency that specialized in television ads. In that role, Armer later wrote, acted in, directed, narrated and edited television commercials. From there, Armer and a relative by marriage Walter Grauman developed their own television show, Lights, Camera, Action, which aired on NBC affiliate KNBH for three years. He later was hired by the station as a floor manager and then director. He later went on to 20th Century Fox, where he produced several television series, including My Friend Flicka and Broken Arrow.

Armer later became executive producer for The Untouchables. He joined QM Productions where he produced The Fugitive for which he received the Television Academy's Emmy Award, The Invaders, and the first year of Cannon. For his work on The Fugitive, Armer won a 1965 Edgar Award from the Mystery Writers of America, a "Most Popular Series" award from TV Guide Magazine and a Producers Guild Award. He later became a member of the Producers Guild's Television Hall of Fame. In 1980, he became a part-time faculty member at California State University, Northridge, and eventually became a full professor and head of the Screenwriting Option, of the Cinema and Television Arts Department. Armer taught directing, as well as all levels of screenwriting.

== Personal life and death ==
Armer and his wife, the former Elaine Duschnes, were married 53 years until her death in 2002. They had four children. Arner receuved an honorary degree from California State University, Northridge. He died of colon cancer on December 5, 2010, at his Century City, California home.
