= Barbara Hoyt =

Manson Family member (1951–2017)

- Born: December 27, 1951; Seattle, Washington, U.S.
- Died: December 3, 2017 (aged 65)
- Occupation: Nurse
- Known for: Former member of the Manson Family

Barbara Hoyt (December 27, 1951 – December 3, 2017) was an American nurse and a member of the "Manson Family", led by Charles Manson.

Hoyt was a witness in District Attorney Vincent Bugliosi's prosecution of Manson and his followers for the Tate-LaBianca murders.

== Life ==
When she was 17, Hoyt left home after an argument with her father and was found by a group of Manson's followers. She lived with the Manson Family at Spahn Ranch until shortly after the Tate–LaBianca murders, when she left after overhearing Susan Atkins describing the murder.

In 1971, five Manson followers – Catherine Share, Lynette Fromme, Dennis Rice, Steve Grogan and Ruth Ann Moorehouse – were charged with attempted murder after they plotted to murder Hoyt to prevent her testifying for the prosecution during the Tate/LaBianca murder trial.

Moorehouse was to lure Hoyt to Honolulu, Hawaii, so that she would be unable to testify. Once in Hawaii, if Hoyt could not be convinced not to testify, Moorehouse was to kill her. On September 9, 1970, as Moorehouse was preparing to board her flight back to California, it was alleged that Moorehouse bought Hoyt a hamburger and laced it with a multi-dose of LSD, then left her and flew back to California. Hoyt survived the attempt on her life. Share and the others were initially charged with attempted murder; the charge was later reduced to conspiracy to dissuade a witness from testifying.

Share, Fromme, Rice, and Grogan served 90-day sentences in the Los Angeles County Jail. Moorehouse never served her sentence, as she failed to appear at the sentencing hearing.

After Hoyt had pursued a career in nursing, she became friends with Sharon Tate's sister, Debra.

== Death ==
Hoyt died of natural causes on December 3, 2017, at the age of 65.
