= Roman Polanski filmography =

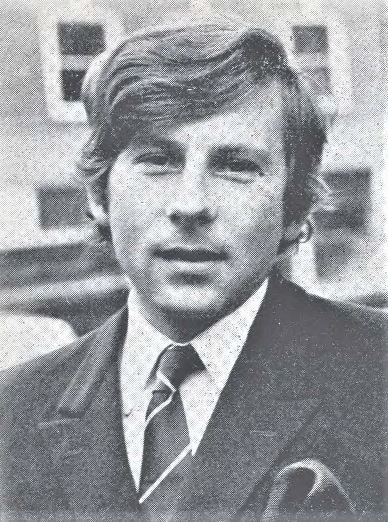
Polanski in 1969

Roman Polanski (born 1933) is a Polish-French filmmaker.

== Filmography ==
=== Feature films ===
==== As director ====
Year	Title	Director	Writer	Producer	Notes
1962	Knife in the Water	Yes	Yes	No	
1965	Repulsion	Yes	Yes	No	
1966	Cul-de-sac	Yes	Yes	No	
1967	The Fearless Vampire Killers	Yes	Yes	No	Original title: Dance of the Vampires
1968	Rosemary's Baby	Yes	Yes	No	
1971	Macbeth	Yes	Yes	No	
1972	What?	Yes	Yes	No	Original title: Diary of Forbidden Dreams
1974	Chinatown	Yes	Uncredited	No	
1976	The Tenant	Yes	Yes	No	
1979	Tess	Yes	Yes	No	
1986	Pirates	Yes	Yes	No	
1988	Frantic	Yes	Yes	No	
1992	Bitter Moon	Yes	Yes	Yes	
1994	Death and the Maiden	Yes	No	No	
1999	The Ninth Gate	Yes	Yes	Yes	
2002	The Pianist	Yes	No	Yes	
2005	Oliver Twist	Yes	No	Yes	
2010	The Ghost Writer	Yes	Yes	Yes	
2011	Carnage	Yes	Yes	No	
2013	Venus in Fur	Yes	Yes	No	
2017	Based on a True Story	Yes	Yes	No	
2019	An Officer and a Spy	Yes	Yes	No	
2023	The Palace	Yes	Yes	No	

==== Writer only ====
Year	Original Title	English Title	Director	Notes
1964	Aimez-vous les femmes?	A Taste for Women	Jean Léon	
1969	Downhill Racer		Michael Ritchie	Uncredited script revisions
1970	A Day at the Beach		Simon Hesera	Also uncredited producer
1971	Le Bateau sur l'herbe	The Boat on the Grass	Gérard Brach	
1979	Hurricane		Jan Troell	Uncredited

=== Short films ===
Student

Year	Original Polish Title	English Title	Director	Writer	Notes
1957	Morderstwo	A Murderer	Yes	Uncredited	
1957	Usmiech zębiczny	A Toothy Smile	Yes	Uncredited	
1957	Rozbijemy zabawę	Break Up the Dance	Yes	Yes	
1958	Dwaj ludzie z szafą	Two Men and a Wardrobe	Yes	Yes	
1959	Lampa	The Lamp	Yes	Yes	
1959	Gdy spadają anioły	When Angels Fall	Yes	Yes	Diploma film

Professional

Year	Original Title	English Title	Director	Writer	Producer	Notes
1961	Le Gros et le Maigre	The Fat and the Lean	Yes	Yes	Yes	
1962	Ssaki	Mammals	Yes	Yes	No	
1964	"La rivière de diamants"	"The Diamond River"	Yes	Yes	No	segment from The World's Most Beautiful Swindlers
2007	"Cinéma erotique"	"Erotic Cinema"	Yes	Yes	Yes	segment from To Each His Own Cinema

Advertisement

Year	Title	Director	Writer	Notes
2009	Greed	Yes	Yes	for Francesco Vezzoli
2012	A Therapy	Yes	Yes	for Prada

=== Acting roles ===
Year	Title	Role	Notes
1953	Trzy opowieści	Genek 'The Little'	aka Three Stories; segment "Jacek"
1955	Zaczarowany rower	Adas	aka Magical Bicycle
1955	Pokolenie	Mundek	aka A Generation
1956	Nikodem Dyzma	Boy at Hotel	
1957	Wraki		aka The Wrecks
1957	Koniec nocy	Little One	aka End of the Night
1958	Dwaj ludzie z szafą	Bad boy	aka Two Men and a Wardrobe
1958	Zadzwońcie do mojej żony?	Dancer	aka Call My Wife
1959	Gdy spadają anioły	Old woman	aka When Angels Fall
1959	Lotna	Musician	
1960	Zezowate szczęście	Jola's Tutor	aka Bad Luck
1960	Do widzenia, do jutra	Romek	aka Good Bye, Till Tomorrow
1960	Niewinni czarodzieje	Dudek "Polo"	aka Innocent Sorcerers
1961	Ostrożnie, Yeti!		aka Beware of Yeti!
1961	Le Gros et le maigre	The Lean	aka The Fat and the Lean
1961	Samson		
1962	Nóż w wodzie	“Young Boy” voice	aka Knife in the Water
1965	Repulsion	Spoon Player	
1967	The Fearless Vampire Killers	Alfred, Abronsius' Assistant	
1969	The Magic Christian	Solitary drinker	
1972	What?	Mosquito	
1974	Chinatown	Man with Knife	
1976	Blood for Dracula	Man in Tavern	
1976	Locataire, Le	Trelkovsky	aka The Tenant
1982	Chassé-croisé		
1989	En attendant Godot	Lucky	TV movie
1992	Back in the USSR	Kurilov	
1994	Una pura formalità	Police commissioner	aka A Pure Formality
1994	Grosse fatigue	Himself	aka Dead Tired
2000	Hommage à Alfred		aka Tribute to Alfred Lepetit
2002	Zemsta	Papkin	aka The Revenge
2007	Rush Hour 3	Detective Revi	
2008	Caos calmo	Steiner	aka Quiet Chaos
2019	An Officer and a Spy	A Listener at a Concert	Uncredited

== Unfulfilled and developed projects ==
- Untitled Victor Lustig biopic: When Polanski and Gérard Brach met in the early 1960s, they worked on a story about the man who sold the Eiffel Tower – Victor Lustig. Polanski wanted to visit the location to conduct research, but Brach refused.
- Waiting for Godot: Before he made Cul-de-sac (1966), Polanski proposed a film adaptation of Waiting for Godot to playwright Samuel Beckett, who politely refused to allow it. Beckett insisted that the play was not cinematic material and that an adaptation would destroy it. Despite this, a 1971 NY Times profile indicated that Polanski "yearns to film Waiting for Godot."
- Downhill Racer:
- A Perfect Day: After the success of Rosemary's Baby (1968), Polanski considered adapting another Ira Levin novel to film; the science fiction story of This Perfect Day.
- Paganini: Another possibility following Rosemary's Baby was a biographical film on the Italian violinist Niccolò Paganini. It was indicated at the time that Polanski was drawn to stories about "real, equally fascinating people of the 19th century." Paramount Pictures was the studio behind the project. "Paganini has been an obsession with me for almost 15 years," Polanski told the NY Times in 1969. "I'm working on the script now with Ennio De Concini. We'll stress Paganini's amazing character so full of contradictions." With the film, Polanski particularly aimed to capture the "devilishness" and "virtuosity" behind Paganini—unseen in any previous films—as well as his "constant conflict with society, the church, kings, fellow artists and the many women who fell in love with this physically ugly man." Principal photography was estimated to commence in late 1969, with locations in Italy, France and Austria. However, as result of the unseen tragedy of the murder of his pregnant wife Sharon Tate, Polanski effectively shelved any plans he had for the film.
- Donner Pass: At the same time as Paganini, Polanski was preparing, and pursuing concepts for, a retelling of the ill-fated Donner Party, a group of Western pioneers who were forced to resort to cannibalism to survive when they became trapped in the snowbound Sierras. The project was titled Donner Pass, and was to have also been released by Paramount. Ivan Moffat worked on the screenplay. In early 1969, Polanski detailed his vision to the NY Times: "It will tell the story of a group of educated people facing the ultimate test of character. What interests me is showing how far such people can go before they break or don’t break—when the moment of truth hits them." He eventually deciding to film Robert Merle's novel The Day of the Dolphin for the screen as his follow-up to Rosemary's Baby; these plans too were thwarted in the wake of Sharon Tate's death.
- Day of the Dolphin:
- Untitled Mexico-set film: With the arrest of his wife's murderer, Charles Manson, Polanski left Los Angeles and agreed to an unnamed film in Mexico. Friends of the director said he half‐heartedly worked on the project. Nevertheless, it soon fell apart, and Polanski eventually selected Macbeth (1971) to be his next film.
- Papillon: In early 1970, when the film rights to Henri Charrière's novel Papillon were purchased by Walter Reade's Continental Distributing Inc., Polanski was reportedly set to direct the adaptation, with Warren Beatty starring. The role eventually went to Steve McQueen, who was cast alongside Dustin Hoffman in the resulting 1973 film directed by Franklin J. Schaffner.
- White Dog:
- The First Deadly Sin: In 1976, a deal was struck with Columbia Pictures for Polanski to adapt and direct Lawrence Sander's police procedural The First Deadly Sin. This too, like Day of the Dolphin, had to be scrapped after Polanski agreed to a plea bargain wherein he admitted to unlawful sexual intercourse with a minor, agreed to psychiatric evaluation and expected to be released on probation. Though Columbia halted development of The First Deadly Sin, Dino De Laurentiis subsequently came to Polanski with a proposed remake of John Ford's The Hurricane (1937).
- Moon Trap: After The Missouri Breaks (1976), star Jack Nicholson wanted to make another Western, and to reunite with Polanski following their work on Chinatown (1975). He offered Polanski a project he adapted called Moon Trap, based on the novel by Don Berry. Though he agreed to direct, Nicholson dropped it when the director was arrested on a child molestation charge in 1977. Following rewrites by Alan Sharp, Nicholson later sought to direct the film himself, with reported efforts made in 1985 and 1998, to no avail.
- The Hurricane:
- Handcarved Coffins: In the early 1980s, Polanski was said to have considered making the film of "Handcarved Coffins", a novella from the collection Music for Chameleons by Truman Capote, with Lester Persky producing.
- Schindler's List: Years prior to making The Pianist (2002), Polanski had wanted to make a film on the subject of the Holocaust and his youth, and, in the mid-1980s, was offered by Steven Spielberg the chance to direct an adaptation of Schindler's Ark. "[It was] a very generous offer but not right for me," said Polanski. Spielberg ultimately directed the story himself as Schindler's List (1993).
- Untitled Cannon Films project: Also in the mid-1980s, after picking up Pirates (1986) for distribution, Cannon advertised that they were producing an upcoming project to be directed by Polanski. It never came to fruition. In print ads, it was billed simply as "A Roman Polanski Film", with no further details listed.
- The Adventures of Tintin: In the late 1980s, Polanski became attached to a proposed film adapting the Adventures of Tintin comics, after Steven Spielberg initially left the project, dissatisfied with the scripts at the time. However, Polanski quickly abandoned the idea as well, later stating that the "actors and natural settings could not work as well as comics." Spielberg would eventually return to the helm later on his career with The Adventures of Tintin: The Secret of the Unicorn (2011), produced using motion capture technology.
- M. Butterfly: In 1988, Daily Variety named Polanski as among those interested in taking the helm of a feature film version of David Henry Hwang's play M. Butterfly, following the show's successful Broadway debut. Others who expressed interest included Warren Beatty, David Brown, Miloš Forman, and Samuel Goldwyn Jr.
- The Master and Margarita: In 1989, Polanski adapted and was set to film a version of Mikhail Bulgakov's The Master and Margarita, set in Communist Moscow; a novel he said he "was born to direct". The project was dropped by Warner Bros. due to budgetary concerns and the studio's belief that the subject matter was no longer relevant after to the fall of the Berlin Wall. Polanski since described his script as the best he had ever adapted.
- Mary Reilly:
- Sliver: In the early 1990s, Rosemary's Baby and Chinatown producer Robert Evans sought Polanski as the director of a film based on Sliver by Ira Levin, adapted by Joe Eszterhas. The film's New York setting was considered being relocated to Paris in order to accommodate Polanski, since he could not return to the United States. According to his autobiography, Evans broached having a second unit director shoot some footage of New York, while Polanski could direct the majority of the film from Paris.
- The Island of Dr. Moreau: Around 1993–94, unbeknownst to director Richard Stanley, Polanski was set in place by executives at New Line Cinema to helm The Island of Dr. Moreau when Marlon Brando first became attached star. Stanley protested this decision, and won out—though he would ultimately by replaced, by John Frankenheimer.
- Cinderella: According to a 1994 Los Angeles Times profile on screenwriter Gérard Brach, he and Polanski had recently completed a version of Cinderella. This marked their eleventh script collaboration together.
- The Picture of Dorian Gray: In 1995, Robert Evans and Polanski were in talks to collaboratively reunite on a new version of Oscar Wilde's The Picture of Dorian Gray, with Polanski directing and Evans producing. "I know [Polanski] can add an even more bizarre telling of the Oscar Wilde story," Evans told Daily Variety at the time. "We can make it very scary — and use the new technology in addition."
- The Double: In 1996, Polanski was due to have directed John Travolta in Mandalay Entertainment's modern-day Dostoevsky adaptation The Double, which shut down when Travolta exited during rehearsals in Paris. The role had previously had Anthony Hopkins attached. A week later, Steve Martin agreed to replace Travolta, but co-star Isabelle Adjani stated she was only prepared to work with Travolta, left the production as well, and Polanski followed. John Goodman and Jean Reno were also among those cast, and sets were also constructed. Conflicting reports arose as to why Travolta departed in the first place. A spokeswoman from Mandalay claimed that Travolta left due to "medical reasons with his son" and still planned to do the film, but Daily Variety said sources close to the production blamed the star's exit on an "angry confrontation" with Polanski. Buzz Magazine reported that Travolta walked off the set because Polanski "had the bad form to start an argument over Travolta's belief in Scientology." Travolta, however, told Paris Match that the director wanted to make a cartoon, not a film, and that a nude scene was added to the script "for no reason. [...] I have never acted naked in my whole career, and it's not now that I'm fat that I'm going to start."
- The Count of Monte Cristo: It was officially confirmed to Daily Variety in 1997 that Polanski was developing The Count of Monte Cristo—which he planned to direct—for Alliance Pictures. Andrew Davis was writing the adaptation, and Polanski said that the start date for shooting depended on how development of the script progressed. However, the film was not made. "We were so stately in our progress that Disney finished their version first, so our script is on a shelf," Davis said in a 2001 interview.
- Master Class: In 1998, Daily Variety reported that Faye Dunaway was courting Polanski to serve as director on the feature version of the stage play Master Class. However, he was not able to accept the offer as he was already committed to direct The Ninth Gate (1999).
- A Series of Unfortunate Events: In the early 2000s, Polanski expressed his interest to Paramount in directing their planned film version of the Lemony Snicket's A Series of Unfortunate Events novel series. Author Daniel Handler credits the studio's reasoning for not choosing him as: "A man who cannot enter this country because of statutory rape is not going to be making a children's film".
- Pompeii: In February 2007, it was announced that Polanski would direct a $130 million adaptation of Robert Harris' novel Pompeii. It was scheduled to begin production in August, and dated for a 2008 release. Orlando Bloom and Scarlett Johansson were rumoured to be starring, but in September 2007 he left the project due to concerns over the threatened Screen Actors Guild strike.
- True Crimes: As early as 2008, The Guardian reported on the possibility of making a film based on the murder of businessperson Dariusz Janiszewski, with Polanski the leading candidate for director from the outset. By 2011, it was indicated that David Grann's New Yorker article on the story, entitled "True Crimes", was being developed at Focus Features with Polanski circling and Brett Ratner producing from a script by Jeremy Brock. In 2013, it was reported that Christoph Waltz would portray Janiszewski in True Crimes.
- Untitled pre-WWII film: In an October 2011 interview with French outlet Le Figaro, Polanski announced his intention to next make a pre-World War II film about ageing. "It would follow the stages in the life of a woman who would not have at her disposal the resources of today like cosmetic surgery, creams and pills," he expounded.
- Untitled film: In his review of The Palace (2023), Joseph McBride noted that although the film was reportedly intended as Polanski's "finale", he had heard that the director was planning another project. In 2025, Polanski confirmed plans to shoot his next film in Poland later that year.

== See also ==
- Weekend of a Champion
