= Alastair McIntyre =

British film editor and sound editor

- Born: 2 April 1927; Oxfordshire, England
- Died: 1 May 1986 (aged 59); London, England
- Other name: Alistair McIntyre
- Occupations: Film editor, sound editor
- Years active: 1952–1979 (feature films)
- Notable work: Repulsion (1965); Cul-de-sac (1966); Tess (1979)
- Spouse: Sybil McIntyre

Alastair McIntyre (2 April 1927 – 1 May 1986) was a British film editor and sound editor, best known for his association with the director Roman Polanski, with whom he worked on six films between 1965 and 1979. He was involved in over 40 film productions in a career that spanned three decades, including 14 credits as an editor.

== Early career ==
Alastair McIntyre was born in Oxfordshire in 1927. His first major opportunity in the film industry came when he assisted editor Peter Tanner on Thorold Dickinson's 1952 film Secret People, which featured Audrey Hepburn in a notable early supporting role. Thereafter, McIntyre worked as an assistant editor on several other Ealing Studios productions, including I Believe in You (1952) and The Cruel Sea (1953), before beginning his career as a sound editor on Basil Dearden's crime drama The Ship that Died of Shame (1955). Over the next ten years he was responsible for the sound production and dubbing of several classic British films, such as Dunkirk (1958), Room at the Top (1959), SOS Pacific (1959) and Whistle Down the Wind (1961). The directors that McIntyre worked alongside during this period included Charles Crichton, Leslie Norman, Jack Clayton, Sidney Gilliat, Anthony Asquith, Guy Green and Bryan Forbes. While at Ealing he was known as 'Mac', with an approach to his work that one colleague described as "pretty forthright and without frills – he had little time for the fashionable mystique of the cutting room."

== Work as film editor ==
=== Gutowski, Polanski and Repulsion ===
McIntyre's role as an editor began in 1962 on the low-budget film Station Six-Sahara, which was directed by Seth Holt and starred Carroll Baker, Denholm Elliott and Ian Bannen. Station Six-Sahara was one of two films then being financed by the fledgling production company CCC Film London, but so little profit was generated from either venture that the company was soon liquidated by its West German owner, CCC Film. Although CCC Film London's Polish chairman, Gene Gutowski (who was also the executive producer of Station-Six Sahara), was badly affected financially by his firm's collapse, it did not stop him joining forces with a young compatriot named Roman Polanski in order to make more films. It was Gutowski who, as producer, was responsible for setting up Polanski's first English-language feature, Repulsion, in Britain in 1965, with Michael Klinger and Tony Tenser brought in as executive producers. Having also edited two of Klinger and Tenser's previous films (Saturday Night Out and The Black Torment), McIntyre was an obvious choice to edit this new production.

Repulsion was a technically challenging film to make: one of the key scenes, for example, involved a close-up of a girl's eye as shown in a photograph, which required McIntyre to take three very complex shots – the original zoom shot of the eye in the photograph; another zoom shot involving a gigantic blow-up of the photograph; and then a final shot using a miniature camera that could get "right into the girl's eye" – and join them together using 'invisible' dissolves. Such tasks, however arduous, led McIntyre to appreciate Polanski as a versatile, innovative filmmaker, remarking approvingly to the writer Ivan Butler in 1970 that

[Polanski] watches over the editing as closely as over everything else, keeping a tighter hold than most people I've worked for: but this does not mean he never allows his editor any freedom of expression. Once he became familiar with my work, everything became much easier. He knows what he wants, and it is my job as editor to give him exactly that. His enthusiasm is infectious. He'll hammer a nail into the floor better than the carpenter: I think that at first this was partly because when he came over here and made Repulsion he knew hardly any English at all, and it was easier to show someone how he wanted a job done than to explain verbally.

He later told an interviewer that "[Polanski's] technical skills, his sense of what looks and sounds right, are absolutely uncanny. He's a very difficult chap, you know, very exacting and uncompromising, but it's worth it because Roman's quite a unique fellow."

Polanski, in return, valued McIntyre's knowledge and experience, commenting in 1986 that "Alastair was my first editor outside of Poland on Repulsion and he was to me, of course, more than an editor, because he guided me through all of this unknown industry; it is not the same in Poland as it is in England or anywhere else. I had never seen a Moviola before; we used cutting tables."

=== Later work for Polanski ===
Polanski's next film was Cul-de-sac (1966), which was shot on location at Holy Island in Northumberland. Because of the difficulties inherent in living together in a remote area for a long period of time, tensions soon erupted among the cast and crew during filming: the leading performers (Françoise Dorléac, Donald Pleasence and Lionel Stander) all came to loathe each other, the lighting cameraman Gilbert Taylor punched the actor Iain Quarrier in the face, and a strike was threatened in protest over Polanski's treatment of Dorléac while filming a beach scene. McIntyre – later described by Harlan Kennedy in American Film as "genial" and "voluble" – was one of the few reassuring presences on set, and Polanski subsequently recalled his editor enlivening many scenes in the island's pubs with his "hilarious Scottish vocal act". The two men, according to assistant director Roger Simons, remained "very close" throughout the making of the film, spending most evenings watching the rushes together after the day's shooting was complete.

In the late 1960s and early 1970s McIntyre edited three more films for Polanski – The Fearless Vampire Killers (1967), Macbeth (1971), and What? (1972). Their final collaboration was Tess (1979), an adaptation of Thomas Hardy's novel Tess of the d'Urbervilles which, due to Polanski's legal difficulties at the time, was filmed in France rather than in England. Although McIntyre spent nearly a year meticulously trying to piece the film's narrative together, the finished result – despite being described by Variety magazine in its pre-release review as displaying "excellent" editing – was not to the director's satisfaction. Having already brought in Tom Priestley (who was the sound editor on Repulsion) to help McIntyre meet the strict deadline imposed by the movie's producers, Polanski then enlisted another editor, Sam O'Steen, to come up with a drastically shortened second edit that could attract the attention of a distributor in the United States, where there were still no clear plans for the film's release. When Polanski also rejected this new version as "like watching a film with every other reel left out", he turned to yet another editor, Hervé de Luze, who produced a cut that came in at 170 minutes, which was only 16 minutes less than the running length of McIntyre's original edit; it was this version that was eventually shown to British and American audiences from late 1980 onwards, over a year after the film was distributed in its initial form in France.

=== Other films ===
McIntyre was not only employed by Polanski during this period. In the late 1960s he worked on films for Don Chaffey and James B. Clark, and followed them up by editing a further two films on behalf of producer Gene Gutowski: A Day at the Beach (1970), an adaptation of a critically-acclaimed work by the Dutch author Heere Heeresma that was originally intended as a vehicle for Polanski before it was passed on to the unknown director Simon Hesera, and which was given only a limited release more than twenty years after it was completed; and The Adventures of Gerard (1970), taken from an Arthur Conan Doyle novel, which was directed by another young Pole, Jerzy Skolimowski – who, like Polanski with Repulsion, was at the helm of an English-language production for the first time.

== Final years ==
In the early 1980s McIntyre worked as a tutor at the National Film School in Beaconsfield, while continuing to edit documentaries and instructional films. In April 1985 he was appointed to a full-time position at the School, but died just over a year later following complications from a stroke, leaving behind his wife, daughters, and a son. In a tribute, published in the pages of the industry journal Film and TV Technician in June 1986, Polanski described McIntyre as "first, a friend; a hard worker, loyal and like nobody else I met, fast. It was really thrilling to be working and to be with him."

== Selected filmography ==
=== As editor ===
- Station Six-Sahara (1962)
- Saturday Night Out (1964)
- The Black Torment (1964)
- Repulsion (1965)
- Cul-de-sac (1966)
- The Fearless Vampire Killers (1967)
- A Twist of Sand (1968)
- My Side of the Mountain (1969)
- A Day at the Beach (1970)
- The Adventures of Gerard (1970)
- Macbeth (1971)
- What? (1972) (Che?)
- The Lion and the Virgin (1975) (Lejonet och jungfrun)
- Tess (1979)

=== As sound editor ===
- The Ship that Died of Shame (1955)
- Who Done It? (1956)
- The Feminine Touch (1956)
- The Long Arm (1957)
- The Man in the Sky (1957)
- The Shiralee (1957)
- Barnacle Bill (1957)
- Dunkirk (1958)
- Sea of Sand (1958) (dubbing editor)
- Nowhere to Go (1958)
- Room at the Top (1959) (dubbing editor)
- Left Right and Centre (1959) (dubbing editor)
- This Other Eden (1959)
- SOS Pacific (1959)
- The Angry Silence (1960) (dubbing editor)
- Make Mine Mink (1960)
- The Millionairess (1960)
- The Mark (1961) (dubbing editor)
- Mr Topaze (1961)
- Whistle Down the Wind (1961) (dubbing editor)
- The Quare Fellow (1962) (dubbing editor)
- Night of the Eagle (1962)
- Clash by Night (1963) (dubbing editor)

== Bibliography ==
- Anderson, Lindsay, Making a Film: The Story of Secret People (New York, NY: Garland, 1977). ISBN 9780824028633
- Bergfelder, Tim, International Adventures: German Popular Cinema and European Co-productions in the 1960s (New York, NY: Berghahn Books, 2005). ISBN 9781571815392
- Butler, Ivan, The Cinema of Roman Polanski (London: A. Zwemmer Ltd., 1970). ISBN 0498077128
- Gutowski, Gene, With Balls and Chutzpah: A Story of Survival (Bloomington, IN: Iuniverse Inc., 2011). ISBN 9781462002757
- Kennedy, Harlan, 'Tess – Polanski in Hardy Country', American Film, October 1979.
- Leaming, Barbara, Polanski, the Filmmaker as Voyeur: A Biography (New York, NY: Simon and Schuster, 1981). ISBN 0671249851
- 'Obituary: Alastair McIntyre', Film and TV Technician, June 1986.
- Polanski, Roman, Roman by Polanski (New York, NY: Morrow, 1984). ISBN 9780434591800
- Young, Jordan R., Roman Polanski: Behind the Scenes of His Early Classic Films (Lanham, MD: Applause Books, 2023). ISBN 9781493067923

== See also ==
- List of film director and editor collaborations
