= A Day at the Beach (disambiguation) =

A Day at the Beach is a 1970 film written by Roman Polanski.

A Day at the Beach may also refer to:

- A Day at the Beach, a 1938 cartoon in the Captain and the Kids film series
- A Day at the Beach (Dutch: Een dagje naar het strand), a 1962 book by Dutch author Heere Heeresma, and the basis for the 1970 and 1984 movies
- A Day at the Beach, a 1984 Dutch film by Theo van Gogh, based on the Heeresma novel
- "Day at the Beach (New Rays from an Ancient Sun)", a song by Joe Satriani from his 1989 album Flying in a Blue Dream
- A Day at the Beach, a 1989 Barney & the Backyard Gang video
- A Day at the Beach (album), a 1995 album by Sonia Dada
- A Day at the Beach, a 2005 book by Jim Toomey
- "Day at the Beach", a 2002 episode of the TV series Oswald
