= Eleni Cubitt =

British filmmaker and history advocate

Eleni Cubitt was a filmmaker born in Greece. Her most recent film was The War That Never Ends in 1991, for which she was the executive producer. Under the name of Eleni Collard she was executive producer for the 1968 Jean-Luc Godard film Sympathy for the Devil.

She lived in London and served as the secretary of the British Committee for the Reunification of the Parthenon Marbles, an organisation set up by her late husband James Cubitt to campaign for the return of the Parthenon sculptures in the British Museum to Athens.
