= Sympathy for the Devil (1968 film) =

One Plus One (Sympathy for the Devil)
- 1970 New Line Cinema U.S. poster
- Directed by: Jean-Luc Godard
- Written by: Jean-Luc Godard
- Produced by: Eleni Collard; Michael Pearson; Iain Quarrier
- Starring: Mick Jagger; Keith Richards; Brian Jones; Bill Wyman; Charlie Watts; Nicky Hopkins; Anne Wiazemsky
- Cinematography: Anthony B. Richmond
- Edited by: Ken Rowles
- Music by: The Rolling Stones
- Production company: Cupid Productions
- Distributed by: Connoisseur
- Release date: 30 November 1968
- Running time: 110 minutes
- Country: United Kingdom
- Language: English
- Budget: £180,000

Sympathy for the Devil (originally titled 1 + 1; also One Plus One, by the film director, and distributed under that title in Europe) is a 1968 avant-garde film shot mostly in color by director Jean-Luc Godard, his first British-made, English-language film. It is a composite film, juxtaposing documentary, fictional scenes and dramatised political readings. It is most notable for its scenes documenting the creative evolution of the song "Sympathy for the Devil" as the Rolling Stones developed it during recording sessions at Olympic Studios in London.

== Plot ==
Composing the film's main narrative thread are several long, uninterrupted shots of the Rolling Stones in London's Olympic Studios, recording and re-recording various parts to "Sympathy for the Devil". The dissolution of Stone Brian Jones is vividly portrayed, and the chaos of 1968 is made clear when a line referring to the killing of John F. Kennedy is heard changed to the plural after the assassination of Robert F. Kennedy in June.

Interwoven through the movie are outdoor shots of Black Panthers loitering in a junkyard littered with rusting cars heaped upon each other. They read from revolutionary texts (including Amiri Baraka and Eldridge Cleaver) and toss their rifles to each other, from man to man. A group of white women, apparently kidnapped and dressed in white, are brutalized and ultimately shot, off-camera; their bloody bodies are subsequently seen in various tableaus throughout the film.

The rest of the film contains a political message in the form of a voiceover about Marxism, the need for revolution and other topics in which Godard was interested. One scene involves a camera crew following a woman about in a yellow peasant dress (played by Anne Wiazemsky), in an outdoor wildlife setting; questions are asked of her, to which she always answers either "yes" or "no". As can be seen from the chapter heading to the scene, she is supposed to be a personification of democracy, a woman named 'Eve Democracy'.

At least one quarter of the film is devoted to indoor shots of a pornographic bookstore that sells such diverse items as Marvel's Doctor Strange, DC's The Atom and The Flash comic books, Nazi pamphlets for propaganda, and various men's magazines. Alternating with the shots of comic books, pinup magazines, and Nazi pamphlets, customers casually enter the bookstore, approach a bookshelf, pick up books or magazines, exchange them for a sheet of paper, and then slap the faces of two Maoist hostages sitting patiently next to a book display. Toward the end of the scene, a small child is admitted for the purpose of buying a pamphlet and slapping the faces of the hostages. After exchanging their purchases and receiving their document, each customer raises their right arm in a Nazi salute, and leaves the store. The bookstore owner reads aloud from Mein Kampf.

Mimicking the earlier scene of the camera crew following Eve Democracy is the last scene to the movie where the camera crew lingers on the beach and from afar one man asks another "What are they doing over there?", to which the other answers "I think they're shooting a movie". A large camera crane is positioned on the beach and another woman in white is laid down upon the end of the crane and elevated, along with a motion picture camera, on the platform until she is well above the beach. She does not rise up but remains motionless, half-hanging off the crane, one leg dangling.

== Production ==
In 1968, Jean-Luc Godard moved to London, intending to make a film about abortion. When he discovered that, due to the 1967 Abortion Act, it was no longer a hot topic, he told his producers he would still make a film in London, but on the condition that he would work with either the Beatles or the Rolling Stones. The Beatles turned him down, but the Rolling Stones were happy to collaborate. As a result, he was able to capture their work in progress as they rehearsed and recorded material for their seventh album, Beggars Banquet.

The film was shot at the Olympic Recording Studios in London and at Camber Sands. In the original version running 104 minutes, Godard left the creation of the song unfinished.

According to cinematographer Tony Richmond, the portions of the film not involving the Rolling Stones were unscripted and filmed without permits.

== Release and reception ==
1 + 1 was shown at the 1968 London Film Festival; Godard punched producer Iain Quarrier in the face for the changes made to the film's ending, including featuring the complete version of the song. Godard showed his original version under a London bridge for free after the screening. Godard later told Rolling Stone magazine that he was "disappointed" in the Rolling Stones for not criticizing the use of the completed song and for accepting "their being emphasized over all the others in the film."

New Line Cinema acquired North America distribution rights and the film was shown as Sympathy for the Devil around college campuses during 1969 and 1970, including at University of California, Berkeley; University of Chicago and Hunter College in New York. An hour-long documentary about the making of the film was shown a week prior to the film being shown at the colleges.

In 1970, the Murray Hill Cinema in New York showed Godard's version of 1 + 1 on alternating days with Quarrier's version of Sympathy for the Devil. Roger Greenspun, reviewing both films in The New York Times, wrote: "Why anyone, given the choice, would prefer a producer's version of a movie to a director's escapes me. The movie to see at the Murray Hill is 1 + 1".

In 2018, Sympathy for the Devil was restored in 4K and released on DVD and Blu-Ray for the 50th anniversary of the film's release.
