= Chrissie Shrimpton =

British model and actress (born 1945)

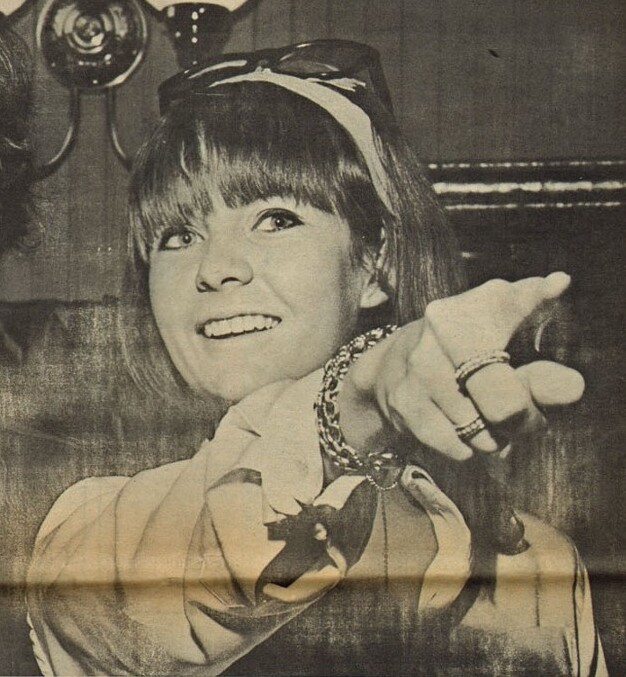
- Shrimpton in 1966
- Born: Christine Shrimpton; 15 July 1945 (age 81); Buckinghamshire, England
- Occupations: Model; actress
- Partner: Mick Jagger (1963–1966)
- Relatives: Jean Shrimpton (sister)
- Modelling information
- Hair colour: Brown
- Eye colour: Blue

Christine "Chrissie" Shrimpton (born 15 July 1945) is an English former 1960s model and actress. She moved from Buckinghamshire to London when she was 18 and started working as a Secretary for Decca Records, later working for Andrew Loog Oldham, the manager of the Rolling Stones.

== Personal life ==
Shrimpton is model Jean Shrimpton's younger sister and was the girlfriend of the Rolling Stones frontman Mick Jagger from 1963 to 1966. They met at the Ricky-Tick club when Jagger was a 19 year old college student and Chrissie was a 17 year old secretary. She was with Jagger on 23 April 1963 at The Crawdaddy Club in Richmond, when Andrew Loog Oldham went to see the Rolling Stones play for the first time. Chrissie was photographed with David Bailey and Mick Jagger, at a party hosted by London Life magazine, in 1966. The couple were briefly engaged, until he made it clear to her he did not want to marry. Later in 1966, they broke up after he fell for Marianne Faithfull.

According to the Stones' biographer Stephen Davis, their 1966 album Aftermath was a source of embarrassment for Shrimpton, since "people generally identified her with the [album's] scathing put-downs", and that it led to an argument she and Jagger had while attending a party hosted by Guinness heir Tara Browne in April 1966. NME reported that the Rolling Stones song "Stupid Girl" was thought to be about Chrissie and her reaction after he left her for Faithfull.

In 2013, Chrissie sold hair thought to be Mick Jagger's at auction. The hair sold for £4,000, with the proceeds being donated to Changing Faces, a charity that helps people who have experienced facial disfigurement.

== Filmography ==
- G.G. Passion (1966) as G.G.'s main girlfriend
- Moon Zero Two (1969) as Boutique Attendant
- My Lover My Son (1970) as Kenworthy's Friend
- Villette (1970, TV series) as Angelique
- All the Right Noises (1971) as Waitress
