= Carnage (2011 film) =

2011 film by Roman Polanski

- Theatrical release poster
- Directed by: Roman Polanski
- Screenplay by: Yasmina Reza; Roman Polanski
- Based on: Le Dieu du carnage by Yasmina Reza
- Produced by: Saïd Ben Saïd
- Starring: Jodie Foster; Kate Winslet; Christoph Waltz; John C. Reilly
- Cinematography: Paweł Edelman
- Edited by: Hervé de Luze
- Music by: Alexandre Desplat
- Production companies: SBS Productions; Constantin Film Produktion; SPI Film Studio; Versátil Cinema; Zanagar Films; France 2 Cinéma
- Distributed by: Wild Bunch (France); Constantin Film (Germany); Kino Świat (Poland); Alta Films (Spain); SBS Productions (International)
- Release dates: 1 September 2011 (Venice); 18 November 2011 (Spain); 24 November 2011 (Germany); 7 December 2011 (France); 20 January 2012 (Poland)
- Running time: 80 minutes
- Countries: France; Germany; Poland; Spain
- Language: English
- Budget: $25 million
- Box office: $30 million

Carnage is a 2011 black comedy film directed by Roman Polanski, based on the Tony Award-winning 2006 play Le Dieu du carnage by French playwright Yasmina Reza. The screenplay is by Reza and Polanski. The film is an international co-production of France, Germany, Poland, and Spain. It stars Jodie Foster, Kate Winslet, Christoph Waltz, and John C. Reilly. In this comedy of errors, two sets of parents try to resolve a situation in a civilised manner as their idiosyncrasies rise to the surface.

Carnage premiered at the 2011 Venice International Film Festival on 1 September 2011, where it competed for the Golden Lion. It was theatrically released on 18 November 2011. The film received positive reviews, with critics praising the performances of the cast and Polanski's direction. At the 69th Golden Globe Awards, Foster and Winslet received nominations for Best Actress – Motion Picture Musical or Comedy. It was Polanski's last film to be shot in English until The Palace in 2023.

== Plot ==
When two grade-school boys get into a fight in the park that results in one boy, Zachary Cowan, hitting the other, Ethan Longstreet, in the face with a stick, their parents meet in a Brooklyn apartment to discuss the matter. Zachary's parents, Alan (Christoph Waltz) and Nancy Cowan (Kate Winslet), visit the home of Michael (John C. Reilly) and Penelope Longstreet (Jodie Foster), Ethan's parents. Their meeting is initially intended to be short, but due to various circumstances, the conversation continues to draw out. In fact, Alan and Nancy begin to leave the apartment on two occasions, but are drawn back in to further discussion.

At first, the couples are friendly to each other, but their respective comments start to hurt feelings, making everyone argue with one another. Apart from fighting amongst themselves, the couples blame each other about who is responsible for the fight between their sons. Nancy calls the Longstreets "superficially fair-minded" and Penelope and Michael complain about Alan's arrogant and dull attitude. Everyone also gets irritated with Alan when he accepts endless business phone calls on his BlackBerry, interrupting the discussion, and showing he has more interest in his business problems than the matter at hand. Michael also receives many phone calls from his ailing mother, to his frustration.

Nancy accuses Michael of being a murderer because he, annoyed by the constant noise it made during the night, had earlier turned his daughter Courtney's pet hamster loose in the street. Penelope becomes emotional about the hamster and with everyone arguing with each other. Other issues include a risky drug Alan is working to defend and Michael's mother has been prescribed, and the question of idealism and responsibility that is part of Penelope's current work.

Michael offers everyone a glass of fine Scotch. Penelope claims she doesn't "get drunk" and Nancy drinks way too many and finally stops Alan's phone calls by dropping his cellphone in Penelope's flower vase full of tulips and water. Penelope and Nancy both laugh uproariously while Michael and Alan try to blow-dry the BlackBerry.

The conversation continues to decay into personal attacks and opinionated statements and, eventually, epithets are uttered. Penelope is ranting, calling Nancy's son a "snitch", and Nancy's true colors are revealed when she destroys the tulips and drunkenly and vulgarly states she is glad that her son beat up Penelope's and Michael's son. The couples realize the conversation is going nowhere. Alan's BlackBerry, lying on the coffee table, vibrates, and all four stare at it.

The film cuts to the hamster, alive and well in the park, where Ethan and Zachary are reconciling on their own.

== Cast ==
- Jodie Foster as Penelope Longstreet
- Kate Winslet as Nancy Cowan
- Christoph Waltz as Alan Cowan
- John C. Reilly as Michael Longstreet
- Elvis Polanski as Zachary Cowan
- Eliot Berger as Ethan Longstreet
- Julie Adams as Alan’s secretary
- Roman Polanski as a neighbor
- Joseph Rezwin as Walter
- Nathan Rippy as Dennis
- Tanya Lopert as Mother

== Production ==
Although set in Brooklyn, New York, the film was shot in Paris, because of Polanski's fugitive status. The opening and closing scenes, ostensibly filmed in Brooklyn Bridge Park, were shot in France against a green screen. Polanski's son Elvis, seen only in long shots in the opening and closing scenes, portrays the Cowans' son. The actress Julie Adams voices Alan Cowan's secretary on the phone and was a dialect coach for Waltz. The apartment, in which almost all of the film takes place, was designed in a sound studio on the outskirts of Paris. Production designer Dean Tavoularis placed a priority on making the set look authentically American, having numerous products and appliances shipped from the US and renting American ironmongery for the doors.

== Release ==
The film premiered at the 68th Venice International Film Festival. The film was released in the United States on 16 December 2011 by Sony Pictures Classics.

== Reception ==
=== Critical response ===
Carnage received generally positive reviews from critics. On the review aggregator website Rotten Tomatoes, 70% of 200 critics' reviews are positive, with an average rating of 6.8/10. The website's consensus reads: "It isn't as compelling on the screen as it was on the stage, but Carnage makes up for its flaws with Polanski's smooth direction and assured performances from Winslet and Foster." Metacritic, which uses a weighted average, assigned the film a score of 61 out of 100, based on 40 critics, indicating "generally favorable" reviews.

John Anderson of Newsday compared the film to Who's Afraid of Virginia Woolf? and said: "The astonishing Waltz steals the picture, possibly because he's the one with a rational perspective (despite his telephonic obsessiveness). He sees the whole exercise as pointless. Ultimately, so do we." Giuseppe Sedia of the Krakow Post remarked that the descent of four adults to a thuggish level has been featured as well in Polanski's short film Rozbijemy zabawę. He added that "it is interesting to speculate on what Hitchcock might have made of Reza's oeuvre".

=== Box office ===
Carnage grossed $2.5 million at the U.S. box office after twenty weeks in theaters, with another $27.5 million in foreign countries, for a worldwide gross of $30,035,601.

== Accolades ==
Award	Date of ceremony	Category	Recipient(s)	Result	Ref
Golden Globe Awards	January 15, 2012	Best Actress – Motion Picture Musical or Comedy	Jodie Foster	Nominated	
Golden Globe Awards	January 15, 2012	Best Actress – Motion Picture Musical or Comedy	Kate Winslet	Nominated	
Satellite Awards	December 18, 2011	Best Supporting Actress – Motion Picture	Kate Winslet	Nominated	
Satellite Awards	December 18, 2011	Best Supporting Actor – Motion Picture	Christoph Waltz	Nominated	
European Film Awards	December 1, 2012	Best Actress	Kate Winslet	Nominated	
European Film Awards	December 1, 2012	Best Screenwriter	Roman Polanski and Yasmina Reza	Nominated	
Goya Awards	February 19, 2012	Best European Film	Roman Polanski	Nominated	
Cinema Writers of Spain	—	Best Adapted Screenplay	Roman Polanski and Yasmina Reza	Nominated	
César Awards	February 24, 2012	Best Adaptation	Roman Polanski and Yasmina Reza	Nominated	
Boston Society of Film Critics	December 11, 2011	Best Ensemble Cast	Carnage	Won	
San Diego Film Critics Society Awards	2011	Best Ensemble Performance	Kate Winslet, Jodie Foster, Christoph Waltz, and John C. Reilly	Nominated	
Venice International Film Festival	2011	Golden Lion	Carnage	Nominated	
Venice International Film Festival	2011	Little Golden Lion	Carnage	Won	
