= The Fearless Vampire Killers =

1967 film by Roman Polanski

- Theatrical release poster by Frank Frazetta
- Directed by: Roman Polanski
- Written by: Gérard Brach; Roman Polanski
- Produced by: Gene Gutowski
- Starring: Jack MacGowran; Roman Polanski; Sharon Tate; Alfie Bass; Ferdy Mayne
- Cinematography: Douglas Slocombe
- Edited by: Alastair McIntyre
- Music by: Christopher Komeda
- Production companies: Cadre Films; Filmways
- Distributed by: Metro-Goldwyn-Mayer
- Release dates: November 13, 1967 (United States); December 5, 1968 (United Kingdom)
- Running time: 108 minutes
- Countries: United Kingdom; United States
- Language: English

The Fearless Vampire Killers, or Pardon Me, but Your Teeth Are in My Neck (shortened to The Fearless Vampire Killers; originally released in the United Kingdom as Dance of the Vampires) is a 1967 gothic comedy horror film directed by Roman Polanski, written by Gérard Brach and Polanski, produced by Gene Gutowski and starring Polanski with his future wife Sharon Tate, along with Jack MacGowran and Alfie Bass, and featuring Ferdy Mayne.

In the film, a doddering vampire hunter (Jack MacGowran) and his bumbling assistant (Roman Polanski) travel to a small mountain village where they find the tell-tale traces of vampirism. The assistant becomes enchanted by the local tavern keeper's daughter, Sarah (Sharon Tate), who is promptly abducted. Determined to save the buxom maiden, they confront the undead Count in his castle. The film has been adapted into a musical, Dance of the Vampires (first adapted in German under the translated title Tanz der Vampire).

== Plot ==
In the mid-19th century, Professor Abronsius, formerly of the University of Königsberg, and his young apprentice Alfred are on the hunt for vampires. Abronsius is old and withering and barely able to survive the cold ride through the wintry forests, while Alfred is bumbling and introverted. The two hunters come to a small village in Transylvania seemingly at the end of a long search for signs of vampires. The two stay at a local inn full of angst-ridden townspeople who perform strange rituals to fend off an unseen evil.

While staying at the inn, Alfred develops a fondness for Sarah, the overprotected daughter of the tavern keeper, Yoine Shagal. Alfred witnesses Sarah being kidnapped by the local vampire lord Count von Krolock. In despair and armed only with a bunch of garlic, Shagal sets out to rescue Sarah that night, but in the morning, he is found frozen outside the inn, with fang marks on his wrist, leg and abdomen. After Shagal, now a vampire, rises and attacks Magda, the tavern's beautiful maidservant and the object of his lust when he was still human, Abronsius and Alfred follow his trail in the snow, which leads them to the Count's ominous castle in the snow-blanketed hills nearby. They break into the castle but are trapped by the Count's hunchbacked servant, Koukol. They are taken to see the Count, who declares himself a fan of Abronsius's research on vampirism. They also meet the Count's son, the foppish (and homosexual) Herbert, who expresses an immediate interest in Alfred. Meanwhile, Shagal, no longer caring about his daughter's fate, sets up his plan to turn Magda into his vampire bride.

Despite misgivings, Abronsius and Alfred accept the Count's invitation to stay in his ramshackle Gothic castle, where Alfred spends the night more fitfully than his teacher. The next morning, Abronsius plans to find the castle crypt and destroy the Count by staking him in the heart, seemingly forgetting about the fate of Sarah. Since the crypt is guarded by the hunchback, they attempt to climb in through a roof window. However, Abronsius gets stuck in the aperture, leaving Alfred to complete the task of killing the Count in his slumber. At the last moment, he loses his nerve and fails to accomplish the deed. Alfred then has to go back outside to free Abronsius, but on the way, he comes upon Sarah having a bath in her room. She seems oblivious of her danger when he pleads for her to come away with him, and informs him that a grand ball is to take place that night. After briefly taking his eyes off her, Alfred turns to find Sarah has vanished into thin air.

After freeing Abronsius, who is half-frozen, they re-enter the castle. Alfred again seeks Sarah but encounters Herbert instead, who first attempts to seduce him, and then, after Alfred realizes that Herbert's reflection does not appear in the mirror, reveals his vampire nature and attempts to bite him. Abronsius and Alfred flee from Herbert through a dark stairway to safety, only to be trapped behind a locked door in a turret. As night falls, they become horrified witnesses as the graves below open up to reveal a huge number of vampires of various past centuries at the castle, who hibernate and meet once a year only to feast upon any captives the Count has provided for them. The Count appears, mocking them and tells them their fate is sealed: he plans to turn both Abronsius and Alfred into vampires. He tells Abronsius that they will enjoy long evening discussions, being intellectual equals, and that Alfred will make an excellent companion for his son, who has told him of his fondness for the youth. The Count then locks them out on the turret to attend the ball, where Sarah will be presented as the next vampire victim.

The hunters escape by firing a cannon at the door—substituting steam pressure for gunpowder—and come to the ball in disguise, where, although exposed by their reflections in a huge mirror, they are able to grab Sarah and escape. Fleeing in a horse-drawn sleigh, Abronsius and Alfred are unaware that Sarah had been transformed; she awakens in mid-flight as a vampire and bites Alfred while Abronsius obliviously drives on, thus allowing vampires to spread across the world.

== Cast ==
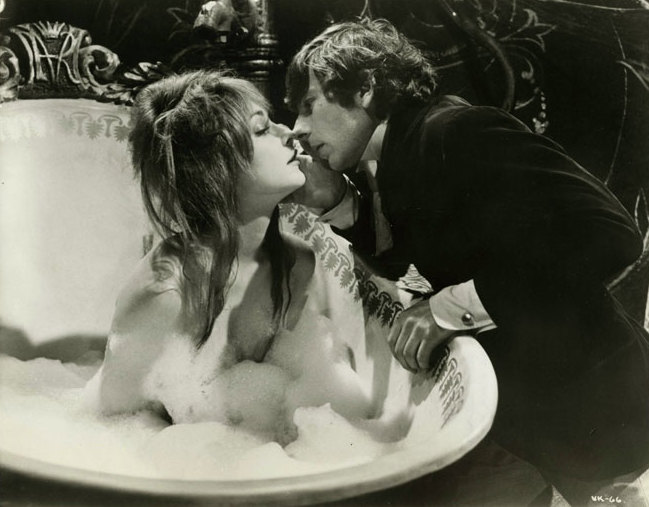
Sharon Tate about to kiss Roman Polanski in a publicity still for the film

- Jack MacGowran as Professor Abronsius
- Roman Polanski as Alfred, Abronsius's assistant
- Alfie Bass as Yoyneh Shagal, the innkeeper
- Jessie Robins as Rebecca Shagal
- Sharon Tate as Sarah Shagal
- Ferdy Mayne as Count von Krolock
- Iain Quarrier as Herbert von Krolock
- Terry Downes as Koukol the Servant
- Fiona Lewis as Magda, Shagal's maid
- Ronald Lacey as village idiot
- Sydney Bromley as sleigh driver
- Andreas Malandrinos as woodcutter
- Otto Diamant as woodcutter
- Matthew Walters as woodcutter
- Vladek Sheybal as the voice of Herbert von Krolock (uncredited)
- Roy Evans as vampire at ball (uncredited)

== Production ==
Roman Polanski talked about production difficulties in his autobiography, Roman: "Our first month's outdoor filming became a series of ingenious improvisations, mainly because the last-minute switch from one location (Austria) to another (Urtijëi, an Italian ski resort in the Dolomites) had left us so little time to revise our shooting schedules. The fact that we were filming in Italy entailed the employment of a certain number of Italian technicians and that, in turn bred some international friction. Gene Gutowski (the film's European producer) rightly suspected that the Italians were robbing us blind."

Cinematographer Douglas Slocombe said: "I think he [Roman] put more of himself into Dance of the Vampires than into any other film. It brought to light the fairy-tale interest that he has. One was conscious all along when making the picture of a Central European background to the story. Very few of the crew could see anything in it—they thought it old-fashioned nonsense. But I could see this background… I have a French background myself and could sense the Central European atmosphere that surrounds it. The figure of Alfred is very much like Roman himself—a slight figure, young and a little defenseless—a touch of Kafka. It is very much a personal statement of his own humor as he used to chuckle all the way through the scenes." This film was the source material for the European stage musical Tanz der Vampire. It is peppered with numerous references to King Richard III of England, who even appears in the ball scene.

When the film was first released in the United States, MGM wanted to market it as a "farce". MGM head editor Margaret Booth and head of theatrical post-production Merle Chamberlain cut 12 minutes' worth of material, and along with adding the animated prologue among other changes, the character of Professor Abronsius was re-dubbed to give him a goofy, cartoony voice that would suit the "kooky" tone of the film. This version was slightly retitled as The Fearless Vampire Killers, or Pardon Me, But Your Teeth Are in My Neck. This was the version most commonly seen in the US until it vanished from circulation in the mid-1970s. In the early 1980s, MGM unearthed a print of Roman Polanski's original cut and sent it to various repertory & revival houses for screenings. Polanski's cut has garnered new interest and reevaluated opinions from critics and fans of Polanski's work, who have previously bashed the film in its mutilated US cut. Since then, the original version of the film is the one more commonly available today and has been released on VHS, LaserDisc, DVD and Blu-ray, and occasionally airs on TCM.

The Fearless Vampire Killers was Polanski's first feature to be photographed in color using a widescreen 2.35:1 aspect ratio. The film is also notable in that it features Polanski's love of winter sports, particularly skiing.

The score was provided by Krzysztof Komeda, who also scored three other films for Polanski, Knife in the Water (1962), Cul-de-sac (1966) and Rosemary's Baby (1968).

=== Animated opening sequence ===
United States

The sequence begins on a sunny day when a bird is minding his own business when the sun behind him sinks and the crescent moon rises in its place, starting the night. The bird becomes alarmed and speeds away. Zooming out, the camera reveals the setting of a graveyard where Professor Abronsius and Alfred bump into each other. The two shake hands and a green vampire pops out from a grave behind them. After the successful scare, the vampire laughs as the camera zooms in on him. This process is repeated twice. A bag falls from the sky; Abronsius reaches in and takes out a box containing garlic, which he and Alfred eat. They sneak up to the vampire (who has no idea where they are), tap his shoulder and breathe garlic breath on him, causing him to shrink and run off. The bag drops to them again and Alfred brings out a gold crucifix and gives it to Abronsius. They sneak up on the now plugged-nose vampire, show him the crucifix, and again he shrinks and runs off. He hides behind the tree and tries to scare them again, but the sun replaces the moon, signaling the vampire to run, and Abronsius and Alfred chase him to a coffin. The bag appears one last time and Abronsius takes out a mallet and a wooden stake. With Alfred's help, he kills the vampire, then places the lid on the coffin. In the pitch-black backdrop, Professor Abronsius and Alfred congratulate each other until the MGM logo appears, startling them. The lion in the logo roars as its fangs grow longer. Frightened, Abronsius and Alfred run away, and blood drips out of the lion's mouth.

United Kingdom/Europe

The comedy mask disappears and the MGM lion turns into a cartoon vampire with blood dripping from its mouth. From its older airings in some European countries, the MGM lion fades instead with a different-looking vampire design. This is found on the MGM/UA laserdisc of the film.

== Release ==
=== Critical reception ===
On the review aggregator website Rotten Tomatoes, The Fearless Vampire Killers holds an approval rating of 71% based on 34 reviews, with an average rating of 6.3/10. The website's critics consensus reads, "This uneven but amiable 1967 vampire picture is part horror spoof, part central European epic, and 100 percent Roman Polanski, whose signature sensibility colors every frame." Metacritic, which uses a weighted average, assigned the film a score of 56 out of 100, based on 9 critics, indicating "mixed or average" reviews.

In his contemporary view for The Chicago Sun-Times, Roger Ebert gave the film one star out of a possible 4, writing "nobody laughed" for the entire length of the screening he attended.

=== Home media ===
The Fearless Vampire Killers was issued on laserdisc in 1993 on MGM/UA, released to DVD by Warner Home Video on September 13, 2005, as a Region 1 widescreen DVD, and later in other territories. This version is Polanski's original cut bearing The Fearless Vampire Killers title card. A region-free Brazilian DVD was issued by Cinemagia that, while using a dated 4:3 letterbox master of the original cut, has the US prologue as a bonus feature. Outside of 16 mm or 35 mm prints, no known official releases of the re-edited US cut exist.

The film, using the same version as the 2005 DVD, was released by Warner Home Video in France on December 20, 2013. This Blu-ray is locked to Region B and does not play on most North American Blu-ray players. In September 2019, Warner Archive announced a US Blu-ray for The Fearless Vampire Killers. Released two months later, it utilizes a new 2019 HD re-master of Polanski's original cut, along with the extras from the DVD release and the addition of the US animated prologue.

== See also ==
- List of British films of 1967
- Vampire films
