= Jack MacGowran =

Irish actor (1918–1973)

- MacGowran in How I Won the War (1967)
- Born: John Joseph MacGowran; 13 October 1918; Dublin, Ireland
- Died: 30 January 1973 (aged 54); New York City, New York, U.S.
- Education: Synge Street CBS
- Occupation: Actor
- Years active: 1951–1973
- Spouse: Aileen Gloria Nugent (m. 1963)
- Children: 1

John Joseph MacGowran (13 October 1918 – 30 January 1973) was an Irish actor. He was known for being one of the foremost stage interpreters of the work of Samuel Beckett and Seán O'Casey.

He was also known to film audiences for his roles as Professor Abronsius in The Fearless Vampire Killers (1967), Juniper in How I Won the War (1967), and Burke Dennings in The Exorcist (1973); MacGowran died during production of the latter film.

== Early life ==
MacGowran was born on 13 October 1918 in the Ranelagh area of Dublin, one of three children born to Catholic parents Mathew and Gertrude (née Shanahan) MacGowran. He was educated at Synge Street CBS. Prior to his acting career, he worked for Hibernian Insurance. He made his stage debut in a Gilbert and Sullivan operetta at the Gaiety Theatre.

== Career ==
=== Stage ===
He established his professional reputation as a member of the Abbey Players in Dublin, while he achieved stage renown for his knowing interpretations of the works of Samuel Beckett. He appeared as Lucky in Waiting for Godot at the Royal Court Theatre, and with the Royal Shakespeare Company in Endgame at the Aldwych Theatre. He released an LP record titled MacGowran Speaking Beckett to coincide with Samuel Beckett's 60th birthday in 1966, and he won the 1970–71 Obie for Best Performance By an Actor in the off-Broadway play MacGowran in the Works of Beckett. Beckett‘s television play Eh Joe was written specifically for MacGowran, and he appears on the cover of the play’s published edition.

He also specialised in the work of Seán O'Casey, creating the role of Joxer in the Broadway musical Juno in 1959, based on Juno and the Paycock, O'Casey's 1924 play about the Irish Civil War. He played O'Casey's brother Archie in Young Cassidy (1965), one of John Ford's later films, which the director had to abandon due to ill health, and was completed by Jack Cardiff.

In 1954, he moved to London, where he became a member of the Royal Shakespeare Company, where he struck up a lasting friendship with actor Peter O'Toole, with whom he later appeared in Richard Brooks' Lord Jim (1965).

MacGowran played the title role of Gandhi in the Broadway play written by Gurney Campbell in 1971, directed by José Quintero.

=== Film ===
MacGowran's film career started in Ireland with the film No Resting Place (1951). Many of his earlier films were set in Ireland, notably The Quiet Man (1952), The Gentle Gunman (1952), Rooney (1958) and Darby O'Gill and the Little People (1959).

In 1966 Roman Polanski cast him as the gangster Albie in Cul-de-sac, before creating Professor Abronsius in The Fearless Vampire Killers (1967) especially for him. Other notable film appearances include the Ealing comedy The Titfield Thunderbolt (1953), Tony Richardson's Tom Jones (1963), David Lean's Doctor Zhivago (1965), Richard Lester's How I Won the War (1967), Peter Brook's King Lear, the leading role of Professor Collins in Wonderwall (1968), and Age of Consent (1969) shot in Australia. On TV, he appeared in "The Happening", episode 5 of The Champions as Banner B. Banner, (Old prospector), and in "The Winged Avenger" episode of The Avengers (where he is sometimes listed as "Jack MacGowan"). He played a safecracker opposite Kenneth Cope in "The Ghost Talks" episode of Randall and Hopkirk (Deceased). He played a thief in "Big Fish Little Fish" episode of Gideon's Way (1964). His last film was The Exorcist (1973), where he played Burke Dennings, an alcoholic director and Regan's first victim.

== Personal life ==
In 1963, he married Aileen Gloria Nugent, daughter of Sir Walter Nugent, Bt.

== Death ==
Shortly after completing work on The Exorcist, while in New York City appearing as Fluther in Seán O'Casey's The Plough and the Stars, MacGowran died at age 54 from influenza after complications resulting from the London flu epidemic. He was survived by his wife and daughter.

== Partial filmography ==
- No Resting Place (1951) – Billy Kyle
- The Quiet Man (1952) – Ignatius Feeney
- The Gentle Gunman (1952) – Patsy McGuire
- Time Bomb (1953) – Bearded Man in Hostel (uncredited)
- The Titfield Thunderbolt (1953) – Vernon Crump
- Raiders of the River (1956) – Alf Barber
- Jacqueline (1956) – Campbell
- Sailor Beware! (1956) – Toddy (uncredited)
- The Rising of the Moon (1957) – Mickey J. – the poitín maker (1st Episode)
- Manuela (1957) – Tommy
- Rooney (1958) – Joe O'Connor
- She Didn't Say No! (1958) – William Bates
- Behemoth the Sea Monster (1959) – Dr. Sampson, the Paleontologist
- Darby O'Gill and the Little People (1959) – Phadrig Oge
- The Boy and the Bridge (1959) – Market Porter
- Blind Date (1959) – Postman
- Two and Two Make Six (1962) – Night Porter
- Captain Clegg (1962) – Frightened Man
- Mix Me a Person (1962) – Terence
- The Brain (1962) – Furber
- Tom Jones (1963) – Partridge
- The Ceremony (1963) – O'Brian
- Lord Jim (1965) – Robinson
- Young Cassidy (1965) – Archie
- Doctor Zhivago (1965) – Petya
- Cul-de-sac (1966) – Albie
- How I Won the War (1967) – Juniper
- The Fearless Vampire Killers (1967) – Professor Abronsius
- The Avengers TV Series: Episode "The Winged Avenger'" (1967) – Professor Poole
- Wonderwall (1968) – Prof. Oscar Collins
- Age of Consent (1969) – Nat Kelly
- Start the Revolution Without Me (1970) – Jacques
- The Yin and the Yang of Mr. Go (1970) – Leo Zimmerman
- King Lear (1971) – Fool
- A Day at the Beach (1972) – The Collector
- The Exorcist (1973) – Burke Dennings (final film role, released posthumously)
