= Gene Gutowski =

American film producer

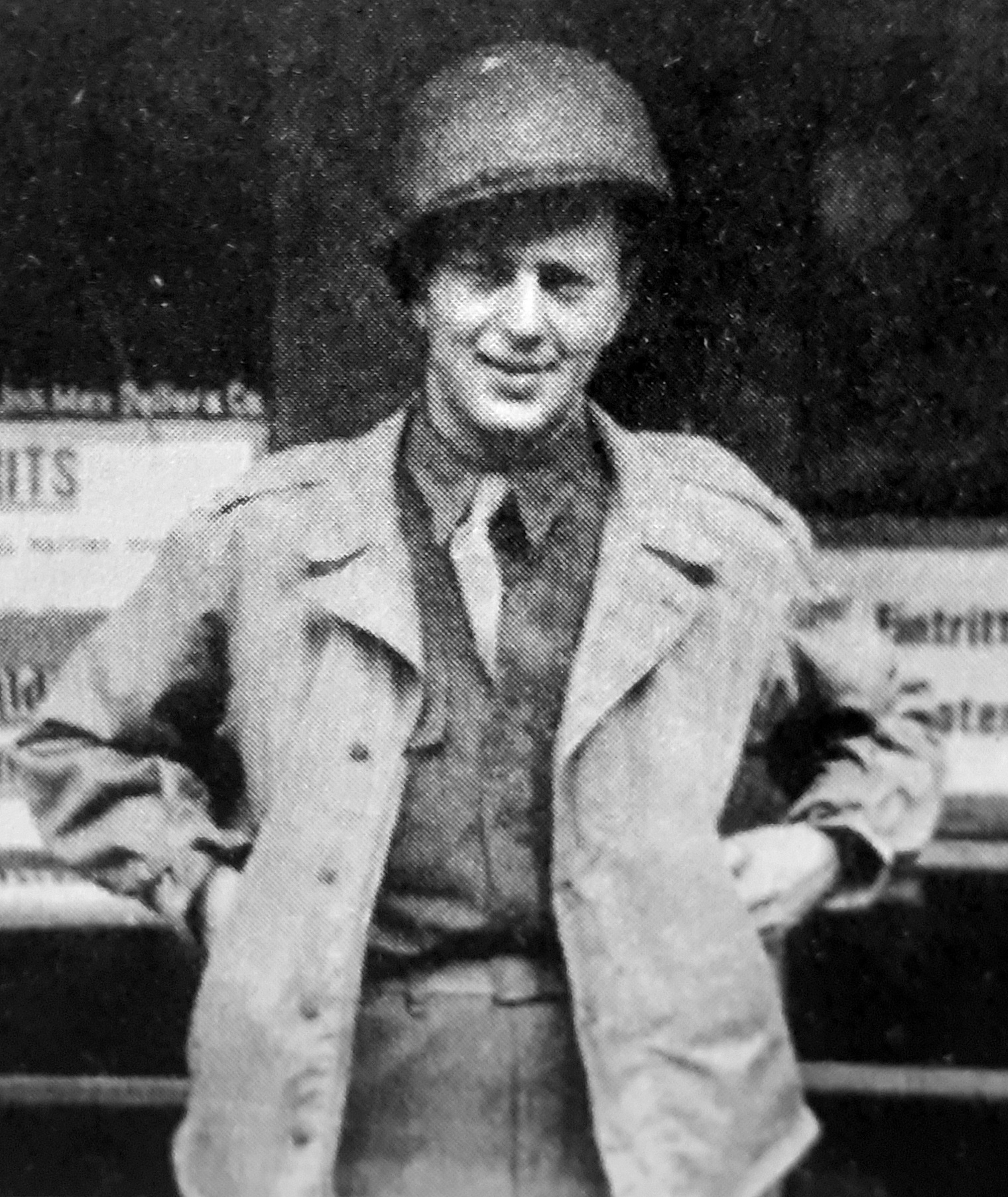
- Born: Witold Bardach; July 26, 1925; Lwów, Poland
- Died: May 10, 2016 (aged 90); Warsaw, Poland
- Occupation: Film producer
- Years active: 1955–2007
- Spouses: Zillah Rhoades (m. 1947–1955) x (m. 1960) Judy Wilson (m. 1963–1973) Corinna Liddell (m. 1976–1983) Dorota Puzio (m. 1990–1995) Asia Smaga (m. 2000–2016)

Witold Bardach (July 26, 1925 – May 10, 2016), better known as Gene Gutowski, was a Polish-American film producer who produced many of Roman Polanski's films, including Repulsion (1965), Cul-de-Sac (1966), The Fearless Vampire Killers (1967), and The Pianist (2002).

== Biography ==
=== Early life ===
Gutowski was born as Witold Bardach in Lwow (then Poland, now Ukraine) in 1925, the son of lawyer Juliusz Bardach and Anna Bardach née Garfunkel, a concert pianist. From 1933 until the beginning of the war in 1939, the Bardach family lived in Rawa Ruska. They then moved back to Lwow, where, under Soviet occupation, Witold began his studies as sculptor at the Institute of Fine Arts under Marian Wnuk. In 1941, the Germans occupied Lwow, and a year later his entire family, who had lived there for generations, was killed.

Bardach escaped to Warsaw, where he first worked for a photographer and later as an employee of the Junkers factory at Okęcie Airport (Warsaw Chopin Airport), secretly removing Luftwaffe radio transmitters for delivery to the underground Home Army (Armia Krajowa). In order to escape from the Gestapo at 18 years old, he took on the name Eugene (Eugeniusz) Gutowski and left Warsaw for Riga, Latvia, where he became the head of a construction company working for the Organization Todt. At the end of 1944, he was evacuated to Germany via the Baltic Sea, Gdańsk, and Silesia to Judenburg in today's Austria. In May 1945, again escaping from the advancing Soviet army, Gutowski joined the Counterintelligence Corps of the United States Army. He worked as a special agent until March 1947, when he married State Department employee Zillah Rhoades, and moved with her to New York City. They had two children: Andrew Gutowski, born in New York on July 17, 1951, and Alexander Waugh Gutowski, born in Charlottesville, Virginia on November 7, 1952. Alexander Waugh Gutowski had one child, Jordan Waugh, born in Saskatchewan, Canada on September 17, 1979.

=== Film career ===
After working for a few years as fashion illustrator, Gene Gutowski entered the film and TV industry, working as a production manager on a couple of episodes of the mid-1950s TV series I Spy which featured Raymond Massey in the lead role. He moved to London in 1960 to produce Station Six Sahara released in 1962. It was there that he joined forces with Roman Polanski in 1963. In a fruitful creative partnership they made Repulsion (1965), Cul-de-sac (1966) and The Fearless Vampire Killers (1967), until Polanski moved to Hollywood under contract to Paramount in 1967. In 1970 Gutowski wrote the script for and produced The Adventures of Gerard, directed by Jerzy Skolimowski, and then produced A Day at the Beach (1970), a picture directed by a newcomer but written by Polanski, and Romance of a Horsethief (1971). Remaining close friends over the years, Gutowski and Polanski joined forces again to produce together The Pianist (2002), which won multiple Oscars. Gutowski staged several plays, including Passion Flower Hotel (1965), Death and the Maiden (1992) and Doubt: A Parable (2007).

In 2004, his Polish autobiography Od Holocaustu do Hollywood (From Holocaust to Hollywood), was published. An English-language edition under the title With Balls and Chutzpah: A Story of Survival was issued in the U.S. in 2011. In 2014, his son, the Hollywood-based filmmaker/producer Adam Bardach, made a documentary biopic "Dancing Before the Enemy: How a Teenage Boy Fooled the Nazis and Lived (Mój tata Gene Gutowski)".

== Filmography ==
- Station Six-Sahara (1962) Executive Producer
- Repulsion (1965) Producer
- G.G. Passion (1966) Producer
- Cul-de-sac (1966) Producer
- The Fearless Vampire Killers (1967) Producer
- The Adventures of Gerard (1970) Writer/Producer
- A Day at the Beach (1970) Producer
- Romance of a Horsethief (1971) Producer
- The Pianist (2002) Co-Producer
- Doubt: A Parable (2007 stage play) Producer
