= The Chairman's Wife =

1971 British short film by Gerry O'Hara

- Directed by: Gerry O'Hara
- Screenplay by: Gerry O'Hara; Julian Holloway
- Produced by: Julian Holloway
- Starring: John Osborne; Zena Walker; Fiona Lewis
- Cinematography: Dudley Lovell
- Edited by: Gerry Hambling
- Release date: 1971
- Running time: 28 minutes
- Country: United Kingdom
- Language: English

The Chairman's Wife is a 1971 British short drama film directed by Gerry O'Hara and starring John Osborne, Zena Walker, Fiona Lewis and David de Keyser. The screenplay was by O'Hara and Julian Holloway.

The wife of a company's chairman stages her own kidnapping in order to gain money.

== Cast ==
- John Osborne as Bernard Howe
- Zena Walker as Margaret Howe
- Fiona Lewis as Elaine Beckwith
- David de Keyser as Superintendent
