= G.G. Passion =

1966 British film by David Bailey

- Directed by: David Bailey
- Screenplay by: Gérard Brach
- Produced by: Gene Gutowski; Roman Polanski
- Starring: Eric Swayne; Caroline Munro; Chrissie Shrimpton
- Cinematography: Stanley A. Long
- Edited by: John Beaton
- Production company: Cadre Films
- Release date: 1966
- Running time: 24 minutes
- Country: United Kingdom
- Language: English

G.G. Passion is a 1966 British short drama film directed by David Bailey and starring Eric Swayne, Caroline Munro and Chrissie Shrimpton. It was written by Gérard Brach, and produced by Gene Gutowski and Roman Polanski.

== Plot ==
G.G. Passion is an ageing pop star living a lavish Swinging Sixties London lifestyle, surrounded by beautiful women and devoted fans. But he is being watched and evaluated by a mysterious organisation, whose members are judging whether his fame and influence are beneficial for society, or not. They capture him and sentence him to death.

== Cast ==
- Eric Swayne as G.G. Passion
- Chrissie Shrimpton as G.G.'s main girlfriend
- Caroline Munro
- Rory Davis
- Janice Hayes
- Greta Rantwick
- Angelo Muscat

== Reception ==
The Monthly Film Bulletin wrote: "There is very little to be said about photographer David Bailey's cinema experiment other than that it is a bad case of would-be "significance" run riot. Some might agree that pop stars should be done away with, but the film's tone is so uncertain (veering between comic speeded-up chases and rather disagreeable violence) that one never senses a point of view satiric or otherwise. In some ways the film resembles a product of the New York school – which means that it equates agitated camerawork with style and essays a desperate kind of elegance (like the girls draped over G.G. Passion's room). The parallel is completed by the fact that the leading character spends a good deal of the time running, but like the film, gets nowhere."

The British Film Institute described the film as "an extremely elusive short, one of a handful of films directed by celebrated photographer David Bailey. This singular take on the mania of the swinging sixties – from one of its key protagonists – follows an ageing pop singer as he is hounded by mysterious assassins. The result of a collaboration between several significant figures in the then London filmmaking scene, including scriptwriter Gérard Brach, cinematographer Stanley Long and co-producer Roman Polanski, G.G Passion remains a mystifyingly underseen mid-sixties treat."

== Home media ==
G.G. Passion is included as an extra feature on the British Film Institute DVD Stranger in the House (2019, Flipside 037).
