= The Adventures of Gerard =

1970 film

- Directed by: Jerzy Skolimowski
- Written by: Arthur Conan Doyle; H. A. L. Craig; Gene Gutowski; Jerzy Skolimowski; Charles Wood
- Based on: The Exploits of Brigadier Gerard by Arthur Conan Doyle
- Produced by: Gene Gutowski; Henry Clarke
- Starring: Peter McEnery; Claudia Cardinale; Eli Wallach; Jack Hawkins
- Cinematography: Witold Sobociński
- Edited by: Alastair McIntyre
- Music by: Riz Ortolani
- Production company: Sir Nigel Films
- Distributed by: United Artists
- Release date: January 1970
- Running time: 92 minutes
- Countries: United Kingdom; Italy; Switzerland
- Language: English
- Budget: $4 million or $3 million

The Adventures of Gerard is a 1970 British-Italian-Swiss adventure comedy film directed by Jerzy Skolimowski and starring Peter McEnery, Claudia Cardinale, Eli Wallach, and Jack Hawkins. It was based on the 1896 collection The Exploits of Brigadier Gerard by Arthur Conan Doyle. In 2011 the director called it "my worst movie".

== Plot ==
Vain, egotistical Étienne Gerard, a French brigadier, serves during the Napoleonic Wars. He thinks he is the best soldier and lover that ever lived and intends to prove it.

== Cast ==
- Peter McEnery as Colonel Gerard
- Claudia Cardinale as Theresa
- Eli Wallach as Napoleon I
- Jack Hawkins as Millefleurs
- Mark Burns as Colonel Russell
- Norman Rossington as Sergeant Papilette
- John Neville as Wellington
- Paolo Stoppa as Santarem, Count of Morales
- Ivan Desny as Gen. Lassalle
- Leopoldo Trieste as Marshal Massena
- Solvi Stubing

== Production ==
=== Development ===
Henry Lester had formed a company, Sir Nigel Films, which had the rights to develop projects based on the stories of Arthur Conan Doyle. Doyle's son was chairman of the company. Sir Nigel had produced the Sherlock Holmes film A Study in Terror (1965). In 1966 it was announced Sir Nigel was looking at filming the Brigadier Gerard Stories. Doyle's daughter in law unsuccessfully sought to prevent this from happening.

Gene Gutowski was a film producer who had put director Jerzy Skolimowski under contract to Gutowski's company, Cadre Films, on the recommendation of Roman Polanski, who had made Knife in Water with Skolimowski. Cadre paid Skolimowski a minimum of $60,000 a year.

Gutoskwi was friends with Henry Lester, who invited Gutoswki to co produce The Adventures of Gerard with him. The movie was going to be financed and distributed by United Artists. Gutowski, wanting a project for Skolimowski, suggested him as director and United Artists agreed. The producer later wrote in his memoirs, "I blame myself as I should have recognized his limitations and expressed apprehensions in the first place, but the year was 1968 and Hollywood studios were eager to try out new directing talent." Skolimowski later said "I was very confident in myself after the success of Le Depart... I honestly thought that I could do anything... When these Americans came along - I hate Americans - and when they offered me all this money to make a film I said 'Yes, why not?'"

The original script was by Harry Craig, who had written A Study in Terror. Gutowski said Skolimowski felt the script was old fashioned and had it rewritten, adding elements of surrealism. "I didn't like the script that much," admitted the director. "Anyway I never use a script like that I just improvise."

Gutowski claims that before filming began he and Lester tried to get the director replaced by UA's executive on the project, Ilya Lopert, backed Skolimowski.

=== Shooting ===
Peter McEnery was announced as star. Filming took place in 1968. Jack Hawkins made the film after major surgery.

The film was shot at Cinecitta Studios in Rome.

Gutowski later called the production "nothing short of a disaster. While Skolimowski was no doubt a talented director, the scope of the film... was well beyond the limits of his experience, ability or skill." "It was the worst 14 months of my life," confirmed the director, who said he lost confidence as filming went on, even going to see Ben Hur during the shoot "hoping to find out how they wanted me to make the film."

Gutowski wrote, "The film dragged on and even though Ilya Lopert and United Artists at last became aware of the problems and put a second director on the picture to help Skolimowski, he was made of Teflon and no arguments seemed to make any impression on him." The producer claims that Skolimowski later apologised, admitting he was out of his element, and that both the director Roman Polanski thought Gutowski should have fired Skolimowsky.

== Reception ==
After filming ended, Skolimowski said "It is not a regular historic adventure, so those who want that sort of thing will be disappointed. It is not nouvelle vague either so it will disappoint many others. But I promise you this - you will watch it to the end. You will not want to talk out. Of course you will think it should be better. But what do you think I feel?"

The movie was not released until late 1970. According to Gutowski, "The film had only a very limited release and lost a lot of money. It also affected my professional reputation and even my relationship with Roman."

=== Critical ===
Sight and Sound wrote "The film is too naive to be Art and too sophisticated to be Entertainment. It also looks as if Skolimowski made it up as he went along" although it felt the movie "carries a distinctive signature."

== Legacy ==
Gutowski claims the chaotic making of the film inspired Charles Wood to write a BBC TV play about a film shoot called The Production.

Filmink magazine argued "the Doyle stories were an inspiration for George MacDonald Fraser's Flashman novels and the failure of the film presumably contributed to United Artists pulling the plug on the proposed film version that Richard Lester was going to make of Flashman at UA with John Alderton."

== See also ==
- Brigadier Gerard (1915)
- The Fighting Eagle (1927)

== Notes ==
- Gutowski, Gene (2011). With balls and chutzpah : a story of survival.
