= Fiona Lewis =

British actress and writer (born 1946)

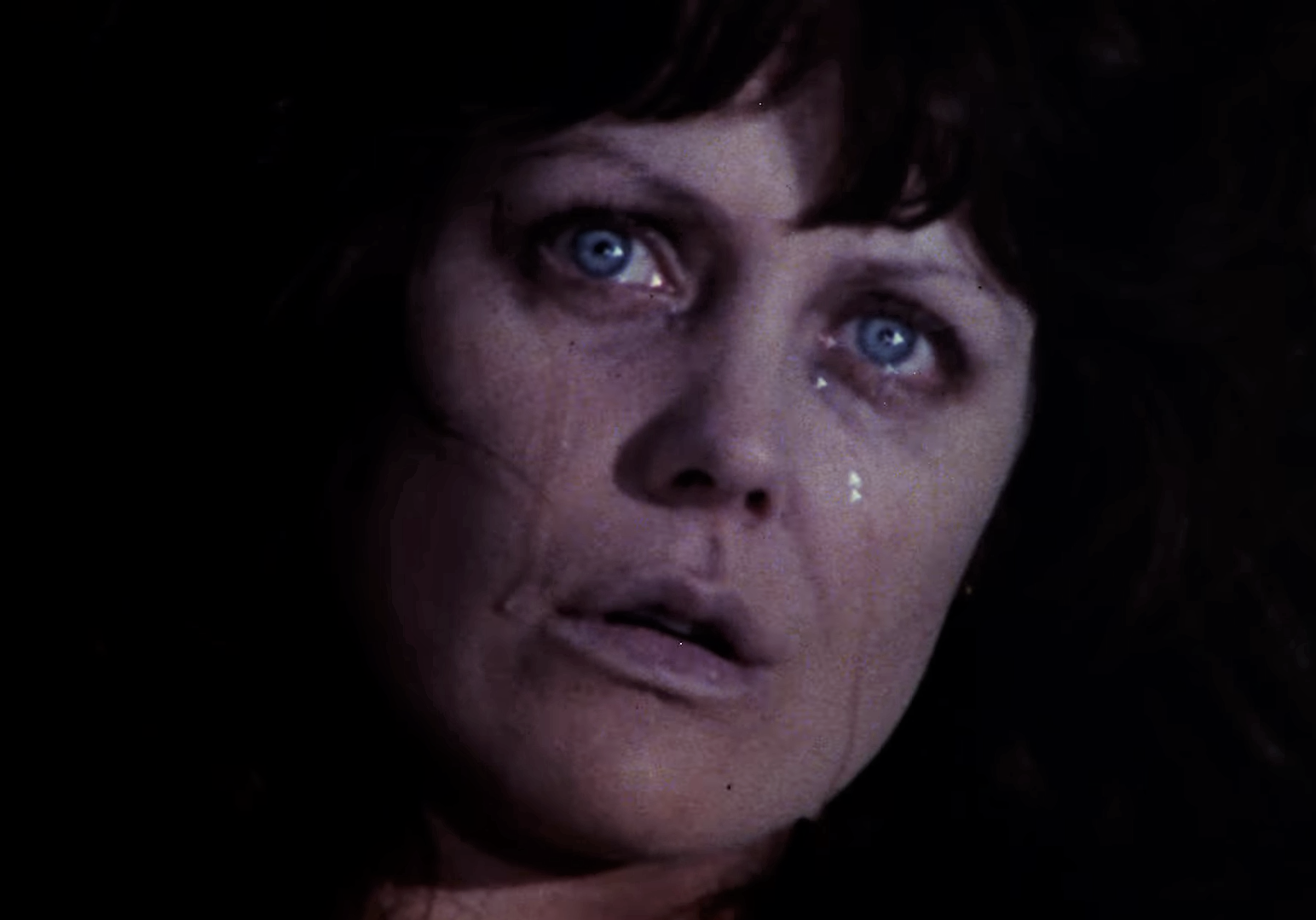
- Lewis as Lucy Westenra in Bram Stoker's Dracula (1974)
- Born: 28 September 1946 (age 80); Westcliff-on-Sea, Essex, England
- Occupations: Actress; writer
- Years active: 1965–present
- Spouse: Art Linson

Fiona Lewis (born 28 September 1946) is a British writer and former actress from Westcliff-on-Sea, Essex.

Lewis is known for acting in such films as Casino Royale (1967), A Day at the Beach (1970), Dr. Phibes Rises Again (1972), Wanda Nevada (1979) and Innerspace (1987).

== Biography ==
Lewis is married to Art Linson, an American film producer, director, and screenwriter. In February 1967, she had an appearance in Playboy as part of the 13-page James Bond parody pictorial "The Girls of Casino Royale".

On television, she had a memorable role as the gorgeous yet tough femme fatale in the episode "A Ticket to Nowhere" in the classic series Department S (1969).

Lewis has written two books: the novel Between Men (1995) and the memoir Mistakes Were Made (Some In French) (2017). She has written for The New Yorker, the Los Angeles Times, and The Observer. Her website, Fiona's French Chateau features information about her French chateau, stories about London and Paris in the 1960s, Los Angeles in the 1970s, and her time working as an actress.

== Partial filmography ==
- Dis-moi qui tuer (1965) - Pompon
- Fumo di Londra (1966) - Elizabeth
- The Saint (1966) - Diana Gregory
- Casino Royale - Casino Girl (uncredited)
- The Fearless Vampire Killers (1967) - Magda, the Maid
- Joanna (1968) - Miranda De Hyde
- Otley (1968) - Lin
- Where's Jack? (1969) - Edgworth Bess Lyon
- The Thirteen Chairs (1969) - 'Angel Antiques' salesperson (uncredited)
- Department S (1969) - Lisa Crane
- A Day at the Beach (1970) - Melissa
- Villain (1971) - Venetia
- The Chairman's Wife (1971, short) - Elaine Beckwith
- Dr. Phibes Rises Again (1972) - Diana Trowbridge
- Bram Stoker's Dracula (1974, TV movie) - Lucy
- Blue Blood (1974) - Lily
- Lisztomania (1975) - Marie d'Agoult
- Drum (1976) - Augusta Chauvet
- Tintorera (1977) - Patricia
- Stunts (1977) - B.J. Parswell
- The Fury (1978) - Susan Charles
- Wanda Nevada (1979) - Dorothy Deerfield
- Strange Behavior (1981) - Mrs. Gwen Parkinson
- Strange Invaders (1983) - Waitress / Avon Lady
- Innerspace (1987) - Dr. Margaret Canker
