= Iain Quarrier =

Canadian actor (1941–2016)

- Born: 12 April 1941; Montreal, Quebec, Canada
- Died: 2016 (aged 74–75); Kensington, London, England
- Occupation: Actor
- Years active: 1964–68

Iain Quarrier (12 April 1941 – 2016) was a Canadian actor. He appeared in only five movies in the mid- to late 1960s before retiring from the film business following the murder of his close friend Sharon Tate in 1969.

== Career ==
Quarrier began his career in two films directed by Roman Polanski; Cul-de-sac (1966) and Fearless Vampire Killers (1967). During the making of Cul-de-Sac, the lighting cameraman Gilbert Taylor punched Quarrier in the face following a disagreement. Polanski recalled Taylor remarking afterwards that "Iain gets a bit boring after dark."

In 1968, along with Jean-Luc Godard, he acted in and produced the film One Plus One. When the film was shown at the London Film Festival, Godard was so dissatisfied with Quarrier's production that he appealed at the premiere for the audience to ask for their money back. A heated argument followed with Godard punching Quarrier in the face.

Quarrier was a close friend of Roman Polanski and his wife Sharon Tate. On 8 August 1969, the night of the murder of Tate and four other people by the Manson Family, he had been invited by Tate to her house. However, he was delayed during filming of Vanishing Point in the California desert (Quarrier was a creative associate on the film). Arriving late in Los Angeles, he decided not to bother the pregnant Tate at such a late hour and traveled onto the Vanishing Point wrap party instead.

His last film role was in 1968's Wonderwall.

After Tate's death, Quarrier retired from the film business.

== Later life, illness and death ==
After suffering a mental breakdown in 1972, Quarrier spent time at Bethlem Royal Hospital.

In 1996, Quarrier received a police caution for indecently assaulting two girls.

On 7 October 2008, Quarrier pleaded guilty at Blackfriars Crown Court to the attempted abduction of a five-year-old girl in a busy supermarket in Ladbroke Grove, West London. He was sentenced to 12-month's imprisonment, suspended for two years. Two weeks prior to the incident, Quarrier had attempted to "purchase" a nine-year-old girl in the same supermarket. Quarrier also received a Prohibitive Activity Order, banning him from unsupervised contact with children under the age of 16 years. He was also ordered to comply with an alcohol treatment directed by his probation officer.

In 2012, it was reported that Quarrier was suffering from Korsakoff's syndrome, a form of dementia. He died in 2016 in Kensington, London.

== Filmography ==
- The Fledglings (1964)
- Cul-de-Sac (1966)
- The Fearless Vampire Killers (1967)
- Separation (1967)
- Sympathy for the Devil (1968)
- Wonderwall (1968)
