= Station Six-Sahara =

1963 film by Seth Holt

- U.S. theatrical poster
- Directed by: Seth Holt
- Screenplay by: Brian Clemens; Bryan Forbes
- Based on: Men Without a Past by Jean Martet
- Produced by: Victor Lyndon
- Starring: Carroll Baker; Ian Bannen; Denholm Elliott; Jorg Felmy; Mario Adorf; Peter van Eyck
- Cinematography: Gerald Gibbs
- Edited by: Alastair McIntyre
- Music by: Ron Grainer
- Production companies: CCC Films; Artur Brauner Productions
- Distributed by: British Lion Films
- Release dates: September 26, 1963 (London); November 11, 1964 (New York)
- Running time: 101 minutes
- Countries: United Kingdom; West Germany
- Language: English

Station Six-Sahara is a 1963 British-West German drama film directed by Seth Holt and starring Carroll Baker, Peter van Eyck and Ian Bannen. It is a remake of the 1938 film S.O.S. Sahara, which had been based on a play by Jean Martet. The film depicts five men working at a remote oil-drilling outpost in the Sahara whose lives are disrupted when a car crashes nearby, containing a beautiful woman and her ex-husband.

== Plot ==
Martin heads into the Sahara Desert for a job at a pumping station operated by an American oil company. The truck taking him there is carrying an empty coffin for a worker killed on the job, and Martin is his replacement, having signed a five-year work contract. The station is run by an authoritarian named Kramer, a disillusioned American with German roots. Martin and Kramer clash from the outset. Martin's coworkers include noisy jokester Fletcher, uptight British former major Macey and Santos a silent Spaniard who prefers to be left to his work.

The work is tiring and gruesome, and the only entertainment at the base is the poker game that Kramer runs at night in which he forces the men to play. One night, Martin and Kramer clash over the outcome of a hand and the tension is broken by the sound of a car horn. The men rush outside as the car smashes headfirst into a stack of oil barrels. The occupants are a beautiful young woman named Catherine and her seriously injured ex-husband Jimmy, who was trying to kill both of them when they crashed.

As Jimmy recuperates at the station, Catherine draws the attention of all of the men. One night, Kramer enters her room and they make love. He vows to leave the station and take Catherine with him. Kramer becomes possessive and jealous, and when he visits Catherine's room one night, the door is locked and another man is inside. Macey, who is slavishly devoted to Kramer, suggests that Fletcher had gone missing that night and may have seduced Catherine. Kramer is enraged and strikes Fletcher, but Martin informs Kramer that it was he who had spent the night with Catherine.

Catherine visits the recuperating Jimmy, who expresses his love for her and asks whether the men have made advances, which she denies. Catherine rebuffs Jimmy's affections but visits him several times. During her final visit, Jimmy produces a large hunting knife. Kramer later enters the room and finds Catherine dead on Jimmy's bed with a bloody knife wound. Catherine is taken away in a body bag and Kramer weeps alone in his room.

== Cast ==
- Carroll Baker as Catherine
- Peter van Eyck as Kramer
- Ian Bannen as Fletcher
- Denholm Elliott as Macey
- Hansjörg Felmy as Martin
- Mario Adorf as Santos
- Biff McGuire as Jimmy
- Harry Baird as Sailor

== Production ==
The film was part of an ambitious plan by the German production firm CCC Films to begin making films in London, which ended after only two releases. It was shot mostly in London at Shepperton Studios in May 1962 with some location work in Libya, where Baker's movements were heavily restricted.

Director Seth Holt said: "It was a sort of dirty film really but there was something in it that was quite interesting. Then I learnt by accident that Bryan Forbes had originally brought this subject to CCC Films's attention and had promised in the little writing in the contract to do a stint at the end. He did a rewrite in four days. It wasn't perfect but it was a lot better than what I had in the first instance."

== Reception ==
Upon the film's American release in November 1964, critic Howard Thompson of The New York Times wrote:

With all due respect to the high-visibility charms of Carroll Baker as a transient temptress who wrecks a small oil-drilling outpost, "Station Six-Sahara" is better without her. So, believe us, are the five seedy colonials manning the bleak oasis before her car crashes into view. Indeed, the first-half hour or so of this British melodrama has real possibilities as a cynical, corrosive close-up of desert boredom and unleashed, petty friction. ... Enter Miss Baker in a random car crash, and the boys now stalk her. She airily parades around the premises and not without success. What started as murderous irony soon turns into a steamy farce that couldn't matter less. The purring Miss Baker seems perfectly at home in No Man's Land but she has managed to seduce the picture as well.

== Bibliography ==
- Bergfelder, Tim. International Adventures: German Popular Cinema and European Co-productions in the 1960s. Berghahn Books, 2005.
