= A Day at the Beach =

1970 British film by Simon Hesera

- Directed by: Simon Hesera
- Written by: Roman Polanski
- Produced by: Gene Gutowski
- Starring: Mark Burns; Beatie Edney; Maurice Roëves; Jack MacGowran; Eva Dahlbeck; Graham Stark; Fiona Lewis; Peter Sellers
- Cinematography: Gilbert Taylor
- Edited by: Alastair McIntyre
- Music by: Mort Shuman
- Production companies: ASA Filmudlejning; Paramount British Pictures
- Release date: 6 May 1970; (Cannes Film Festival)
- Running time: 92 minutes
- Country: United Kingdom
- Language: English
- Budget: $600,000

A Day at the Beach is a 1970 British film directed by Simon Hesera, in his directorial debut, and produced by Gene Gutowski. The film is based on the 1962 book Een dagje naar het strand (translation: A Day at the Beach), by Dutch author Heere Heeresma.

The film stars Mark Burns, Beatie Edney, Maurice Roëves, Jack MacGowran, Eva Dahlbeck, Graham Stark, Fiona Lewis and Peter Sellers. The screenplay was written by Roman Polanski, who was originally intended to be the director, but instead, he recommended Hesera for the job. In August 1969, Polanski withdrew from any further involvement with the project after the murder of his wife, Sharon Tate in California.

The film premiered on 6 May 1970 at the Cannes Film Festival. After a disappointing screening at Cannes, the film was thought to have been lost, with no known release to theaters.

== Plot ==
The film begins with Bernie, a known alcoholic, walking through the rain on his way to pick up his six-year-old daughter Winnie, who has polio, from his ex-wife Melissa. She has remarried to Carl, who Bernie sees getting in his car to go to work, and not missing a beat, asks to borrow some money from him. While he waits for Melissa to get Winnie ready, he sneaks into their liquor, and downs a couple of large shots of vodka.

As they are leaving the flat, Bernie, true to his nature, berates a condescending lady they meet in the foyer, which delights Winne, who calls him Uncle Bernie, because she is unaware that he is really her father. When the pair arrive at the station, Louis is there and pounces on Bernie for money owed to him, and Louis punches him, because as usual, Bernie has lied and said he has no money. When they get to the beach, Bernie gives Winnie something to eat, and then they go into a souvenir shop where he buys her a seashell.

Meanwhile, Bernie is now talking to a fisherman, and Winnie has scampered off into a cafe. When Bernie enters, he immediately attacks the waitress for wearing slacks, but gulps down a couple of beers anyway. Winnie leaves her seashell in the cafe, and wants to return to get it, but Bernie knows they can't, because he has skipped out on paying for his booze. He finds another shop tended to by a gay couple where he buys her another shell, and also nicks some more booze, which he guzzles down.

Since the rain has continued, they go off into another cafe, where Winnie eats pancakes, and again, Bernie sneaks out without paying. During his next two encounters, he meets a Scottish poet who he drinks gin with, and then meets a man from Ghana who he swills down whiskey with, all the while, ignoring Winnie, leaving her completely alone at times, and at this point, she just wants to go home.

Bernie promises to find a taxi and take her home, but before he does, he ditches Winnie in a sandwich shop, while he goes to a spirit shop and scams a bottle of gin out of the owner, and steals a bottle of brandy to boot. Bernie is now totally sloshed, and goes back to retrieve Winnie who he abandoned at the sandwich joint earlier. The film ends with Bernie stumbling around, while Winnie tries to hold his hand and keep him upright. Bernie has now met his final fate as he falls to the ground, striking his head on a pile of rocks; Winnie calls out to him, but Bernie does not respond, and the sad story ends with Winnie seen crying and wailing "Uncle Bernie".

== Cast ==
- Mark Burns as Bernie
- Beatie Edney as Winnie
- Fiona Lewis as Melissa
- Maurice Roëves as Nicholas
- Jack MacGowran as ticket seller
- Eva Dahlbeck as café proprietress
- Thomas Heathcote as dice player
- Joanna Dunham as Tonie
- Graham Stark as Pipi
- Peter Sellers as Pipi's partner (credited as A. Queen)
- Bertel Lauring as Louis
- Jørgen Kiil as Carl
- Lily Bacberg as barmaid
- Sisse Reingaard as daughter of cafe proprietress
- Lise Dietrich as Louis' girlfriend
- Benny Bundgaard as delivery man
- Grith Fjeldmose as passer by
- June Eelli as Gypsy woman

== Background and production ==
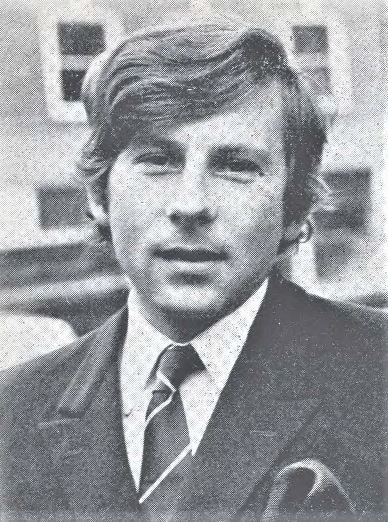
Polanski in 1969

The location for filming was originally scheduled to be in England, but had to be changed to Denmark, due to the film featuring an alcoholic going from bar to bar for an entire day of his life. Polanski discovered that In England, there were harsh time-restricted regulations for pubs, while in Denmark, you could drink all day without interruption. Principal photography for the film began in April 1969 in Copenhagen. The movie's budget was $600,000, which Polanski observed was a significant amount for the time period.

The film is based on Heere Heeresma's 1962 Dutch novel, Een dagje naar het strand, which James Brockway translated into English in 1965, and had published in 1967. He recalls the book's publisher then forwarded a copy of his translated version to Polanski, who thought it would make a decent film, so he wrote the screenplay based on Brockway's translation. Brockway said Polanski "kept very closely" to his text.

When Polanski and Gutowski started their search for the part of Winnie, they placed an advertisement in London newspapers for "a young girl free to go abroad." Due to the questionable language, the first response they received was from Scotland Yard. After explaining their motive behind the ad, Gutowski went to court to obtain a licence, making him "personally responsible for the conditions of the child's employment—including her nap times."

Simon Hesera says the reason he was hired as the director is because he was friends with Polanski, and after hanging out with Polanski one night at his London apartment; Polanski told him he would "make a great director ... and that he had a script for him."

Roman brought me this film as an exercise to get my directing career going. It was very challenging because there was little story, but I looked at it positively as an exercise in style. When it was finished, he seemed happy, proud – although he did apologize for the screenplay. But I could hardly complain. He taught me about directing and gave me my first opportunity. He's not at ease with that period, and perhaps that's why he didn't really pursue the film's release.

American film scholar Ed Sikov says that Hessera cast Mark Burns, who was unknown at the time, and had no experience, in order to make the film "even more raw than its subject matter destined it to be." Polanski later admitted the film is "not good", saying the problem was not only the director and a lack of funds, but the main issue was really the actor, referring to Burns. Polanski said "you can't watch a man playing a drunk for one and a half hours, unless he's a really great actor and has some charisma; that guy had none." Polanski's involvement with the film abruptly ended in August 1969, when his wife Sharon Tate was murdered, and he and Gutowski immediately flew back to California. Sellers also flew to California to be with Polanski, and attended Tate's funeral on 13 August 1969.

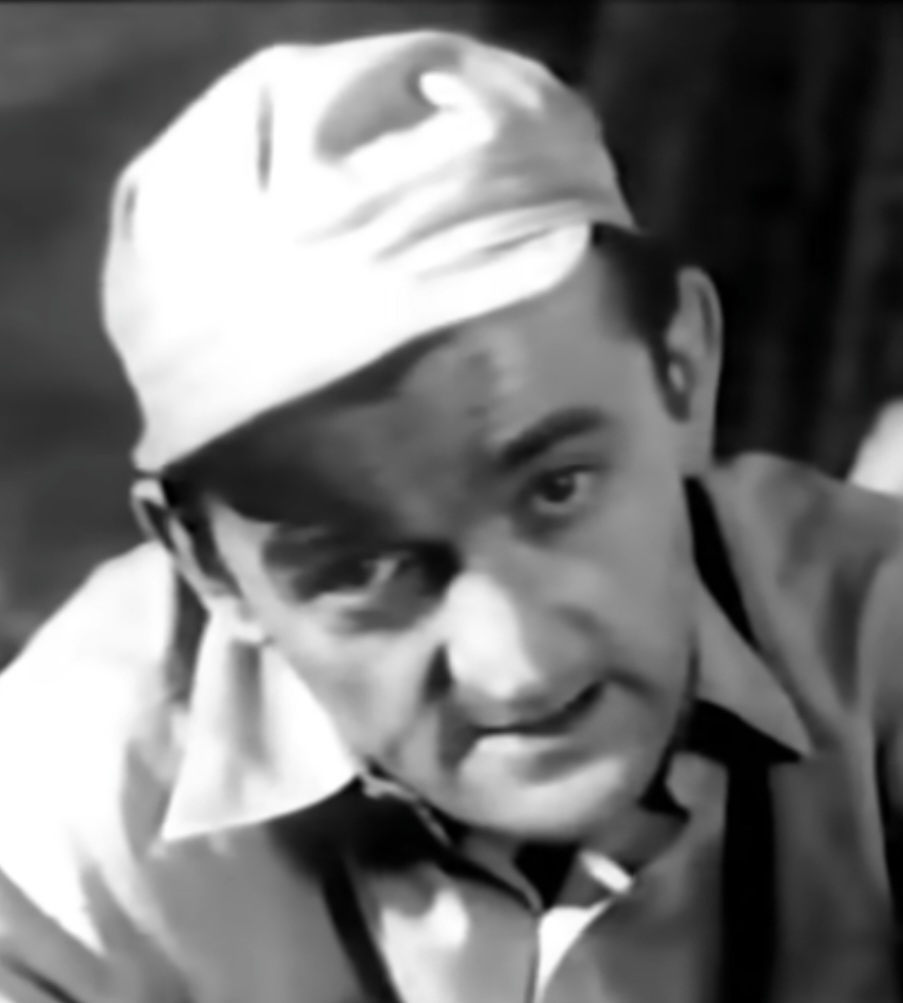
Graham Stark

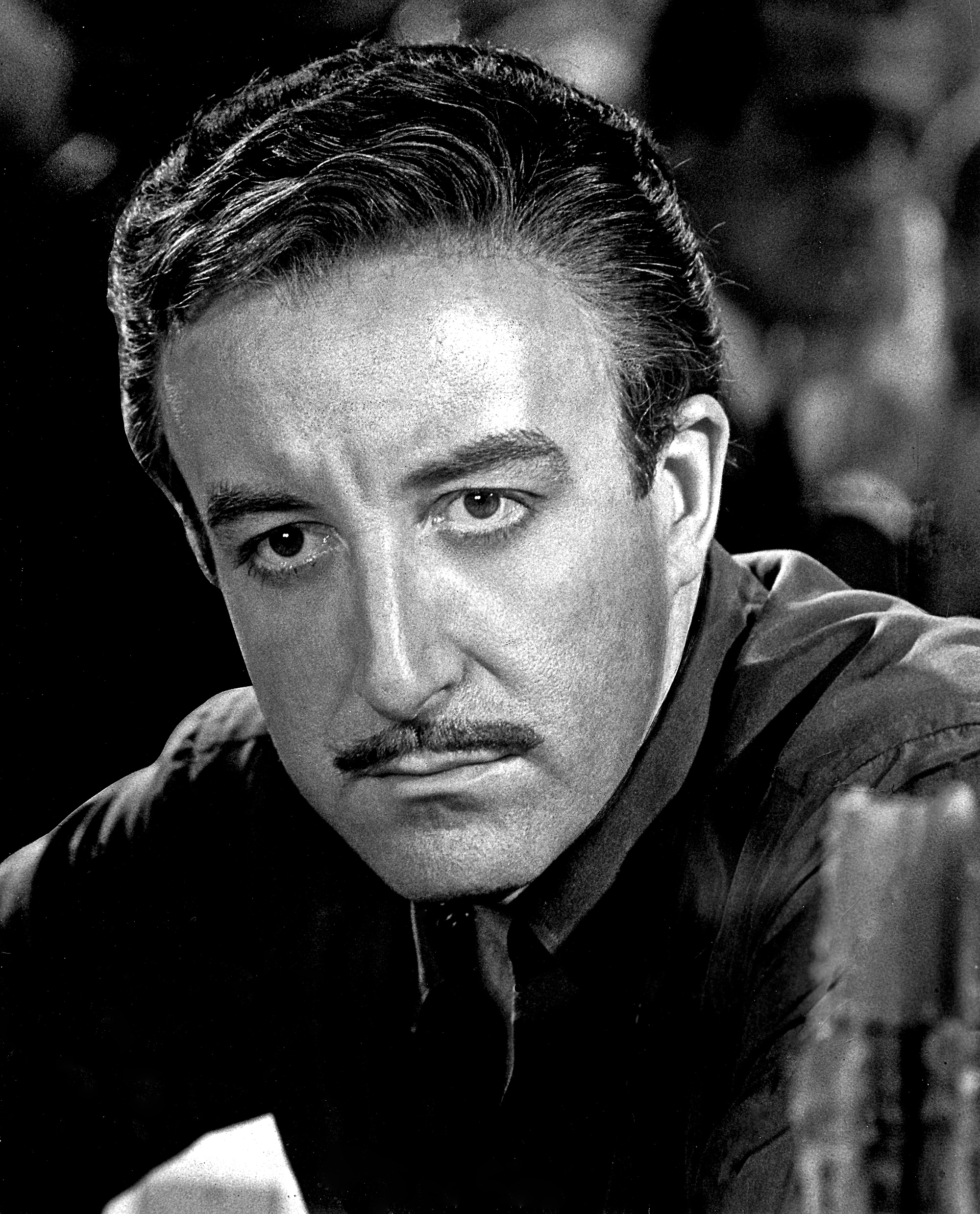
Peter Sellers

Graham Stark (on the left) and Peter Sellers (to the right), who play the "old queens" in the movie

Graham Stark said he got the part in the movie after a phone call from Gutowski. He recalls that Gutowski told him that Sellers had agreed to do a cameo for the movie, but would only do it if Stark agreed to play the other half of the gay couple. Stark agreed to do the part, and a week later found himself sitting in a dentist's chair in England getting two gold caps put on his teeth, because Polanski thought it was the ideal detail his character needed.

Stark recalls one day on the set when he and Sellers were about to start filming their scene, and Hersera told them he wanted a comedy scene "with a capital C." Sellers was not impressed with the direction and blurted out "if you wanted Laurel and Hardy why didn't you book them?" Stark said the set went silent, and Sellers finally spoke up and said "come on Graham, you know what you're talking about, you tell us what to do." Stark said after a brief awkward silence, he looked over at Polanski, who was on set, and Polanski gave him a slight nod, so he spoke up and explained how the scene should play out.

== Release and restoration ==
The film premiered on 6 May 1970 at the Cannes Film Festival. American film critic Thomas Curtiss described the film as "a chilly and perplexing experience which Polanski admirers will find very disappointing." After the discouraging screening at Cannes, the film was thought to have been lost, with no known release to theaters.

The Polish magazine Film wrote that the film screened out of competition at Cannes in 1970. They also noted that it didn't have a U.S. premiere, but it did open in France in the late 1970s. French director Gérard Courant reviewed the film in the May 1979 issue of Cinéma, citing a 1977 release date in France. His review was unflattering, criticising the director, and noting that moviegoers were nothing more than "receivers of audio-visual information."

In French film critic Éric Leguèbe's 1985 book Ciné Télé Guide, the entry for the film, which gave the French title as – Un Jour Sur La Plage, has a release date of 1977 in France. Additional details for the entry include film credits for Simon Hesera, Fiona Lewis, Peter Sellers, Mark Burns and Roman Polanski. The entry also includes a brief synopsis of the film.

Peter Seller's biographer Roger Lewis said he began his search for the supposed lost film in November 1989, and it wasn't until October 1990, that he finally received a reply from a Paramount archivist who confirmed he had taken possession of the only print in August 1969, and shipped it back to the United States.

In addition to Paramount, Lewis had also been contacting public film collections, archivals and storehouses with no luck. One of those entities he had contacted was the De Danske Film Museum, which eventually replied to his query about the movie, stating that the film had its Danish premiere on 17 April 1972, and it did not have a copy of the film, nor were there any prints in existence in Denmark. Lewis had also been in contact with Mark Burns, who told him "the film ran for years in Paris – it had a cult appeal."

According to newspaper reports, the film was pulled from release after a brief 1970 run in Paris and then disappeared. The reason given for the film's disappearance was that Paramount did not think it was going to be profitable for them. The company claimed the movie was "absolutely enervating–unwatchable," and characterised Sellers' appearance as just "a cameo." Variety Magazine reported it had been lost due to a paperwork error, and then spent two decades in a vault at Paramount in London before it was found and restored by Hesera in 1993. The company also said that after its restoration it was shown at the American Film Market. The film has since seen limited runs at various festivals and theaters.

=== Home media ===
The film is available on DVD from Code Red DVD. The Blu-ray from Indicator Limited Series, includes features about the life and legacy of cinematographer Gilbert Taylor; and archival footage about producer Gene Gutowski. A clip of the film appears in the 2000 AMC documentary The Unknown Peter Sellers.

== Reception ==
Variety wrote in their review that "in his first feature, director Simon Hesera concentrates so much on his portrait of the poetry-spouting, beer-guzzling Bernie that he forgets the little girl for long stretches. The audience will do the same, and there goes the suspense. Peter Sellers gives a short (noncredited) lecture in acting as a homosexual kiosk-keeper on the beach. Everything else about the film winds up looking as though it had been left out in the rain, too long."

In his review of the DVD, Paul Mavis from DVD Talk wrote the film, "is a downbeat, admirably unromantic look at a sour, failed alcoholic intellectual, made harrowing by his mistreatment of his young daughter on their day trip to the beach; when the director decides to make our anti-hero sympathetic does he misstep; thoroughly unpleasant, but it stays with you."

Author Paul Newland wrote that "as Bernie proceeds to drink himself to death, Winnie's bright yellow rubber mac burns off the screen, through the dark browns, beiges and greys so typical of British fashion and style of the period." He also notes that while the characters in the film are decidedly British, the street signs are in Danish, as are the elevator floor buttons, and Bernie pays for his drinks in sterling.

Film critic Bill Brownstein said the film "is a deathly dark piece about an alcoholic whose slide into despair leads him to ignore his crippled young daughter; they don't come much more bleak than this one, but the film is fascinating both as a case study in alienation and for insights into the inner workings of writer Polanski's mind." John Petrakis wrote in the Chicago Tribune "it is sad and funny, tragic and ironic, absurd and realistic, all at the same time." He also observed that even though the film was made in 1969, "during a golden period in world cinema; its pedigree shows, and does more than hold up—it dominates."

== See also ==
- List of British films of 1970
- List of LGBTQ-related films of 1970
- Peter Sellers on stage, radio, screen and record
- Roman Polanski filmography
