= Cul-de-sac (1966 film) =

Film by Roman Polanski

- Theatrical release poster
- Directed by: Roman Polanski
- Written by: Roman Polanski; Gérard Brach
- Produced by: Gene Gutowski; Michael Klinger; Tony Tenser
- Starring: Donald Pleasence; Françoise Dorléac; Lionel Stander; Jack MacGowran
- Cinematography: Gilbert Taylor
- Edited by: Alastair McIntyre
- Music by: Krzysztof Komeda
- Production companies: Compton Films; Tekli British Productions
- Distributed by: Compton-Cameo Films
- Release date: 17 June 1966 (London)
- Running time: 112 minutes
- Country: United Kingdom
- Language: English
- Budget: £120,000 or £170,938

Cul-de-sac is a 1966 British black comedy psychological thriller film directed by Roman Polanski, written by Polanski and Gérard Brach, and starring Donald Pleasence, Françoise Dorléac, Lionel Stander and Jack MacGowran, with Iain Quarrier, Geoffrey Sumner, Renée Houston, William Franklyn, Marie Kean and Trevor Delaney in supporting roles. It also features Jacqueline Bisset in a small role, in her second film appearance. Polanski's second English-language feature, it follows two injured gangsters who take refuge in the remote island castle of a young British couple in the North of England, spurring a series of mind games and violent altercations.

== Plot ==
Gruff American gangster Dickey pushes a broken-down stolen car along a causeway through rising seawater while his increasingly weak accomplice Albie lies inside, bleeding from a gunshot wound after a botched robbery. Cut off by the unexpected rising tide, they are on the only road to the remote tidal island of Lindisfarne in Northumberland, where, in a dark castle on a hilltop, an eccentric middle-aged Englishman named George lives with his second wife, the young Frenchwoman Teresa. Dickey breaks into the castle and telephones his underworld boss, Katelbach, to send someone to collect him and Albie. He then disconnects the phone lines and proceeds to hold the couple hostage while awaiting the arrival of Katelbach the next day.

When Albie dies from his injuries, Dickey forces Teresa and George to dig his grave. They then hold a wake, with Dickey and George getting drunk together on the beach while Teresa swims nude in the ocean. The next morning, a car approaches the castle, but instead of Katelbach, it turns out to be a bunch of George's obnoxious friends who have shown up unannounced. Dickey poses as a servant while Teresa flirts with one of the guests, Cecil. As they all sit down to dinner, the young son of one of the guests finds Cecil's shotgun and starts waving it at the crowd of people, frightening them all. He then fires it, blowing out a stained-glass window in the castle. The gun is wrestled away from the child and placed inside a hallway. George has had enough and demands they all leave, which they do, but Cecil forgets and leaves his unloaded shotgun behind.

Dickey takes off his jacket and hooks the telephone back up, while Teresa furtively takes Dickey's pistol from his coat pocket. Upon calling the hotel where Katelbach was staying, Dickey is informed that he is not going to come, so Dickey prepares to take George's car to drive to the mainland. George refuses to let him, and a fight ensues. Teresa hands Dickey's pistol to George and George shoots him several times; Dickey manages to retrieve his Tommy gun from his broken-down car, hidden in the chicken house. Too weak to fire the gun at George, Dickey collapses to the ground, laughing, and discharges the weapon at George's car, which explodes in flames.

Fearful of being implicated in the killing (and of reprisals from Katelbach's other henchmen), Teresa frantically insists that she and George abandon the castle. George is in a state of shock and seems unable to move. Suddenly, they see a car approaching. Not knowing that Dickey's boss had abandoned him, they assume it is Katelbach. Desperate and afraid, Teresa runs and hides in a cupboard. The car arrives, and it turns out to be Cecil, who has returned to retrieve his shotgun. Cecil offers to take them to the police, but George refuses to go. He watches as Cecil and Teresa drive off into the night. George goes on a rampage, destroying his art studio, then running out of the castle and down to the beach. As day breaks, he sits down on a rock in a fetal position and weeps hysterically, shouting out the name of his first wife, as the early morning tide rises around him.

== Cast ==
- Donald Pleasence as George
- Françoise Dorléac as Teresa
- Lionel Stander as Richard "Dickey" (aka Joe Wilson)
- Jack MacGowran as Albie
- Iain Quarrier as Christopher
- Geoffrey Sumner as Christopher's father
- Renée Houston as Christopher's mother
- Robert Dorning as Philip Fairweather
- Marie Kean as Marion Fairweather
- William Franklyn as Cecil
- Jacqueline Bisset (credited as Jackie Bisset) as Jacqueline
- Trevor Delaney as Horace

== Themes and interpretations ==
Like Polanski's previous film Repulsion (1965), Cul-de-sac explores themes of horror, frustrated sexuality and alienation, which have become characteristic of many of the director's films, especially Rosemary's Baby (1968) and The Tenant (1976).

Cul-de-sac has been compared in tone and theme with the works of Samuel Beckett and Harold Pinter and these similarities are underscored by the casting of two roles in the film, Jack MacGowran who was renowned for his stage performances of Beckett's plays and Donald Pleasence originated the role of Davies in Pinter's The Caretaker. The film's German title is Wenn Katelbach kommt (When Katelbach Comes). Christopher Weedman also notes the film's similarities with "such hard-edged Humphrey Bogart hostage thrillers as The Petrified Forest (Archie Mayo, 1936), Key Largo (John Huston, 1948), and The Desperate Hours (William Wyler, 1955)."

== Filming ==
The film was shot on location in 1965 on the island of Lindisfarne (also known as Holy Island) off the coast of Northumberland, England. Lindisfarne Castle, which served as the home in the film, is now a National Trust property and can be toured by the public; despite the passage of time, the building and its surroundings are largely unchanged.

== Reception ==
=== Critical response ===
On the film review aggregator website Rotten Tomatoes, Cul-de-sac holds an approval rating of 83% based on 24 reviews, with an average rating of 7.5/10. Metacritic, which uses a weighted average, assigned the film a score of 75 out of 100, based on 10 critics, indicating "generally favorable" reviews.

=== Accolades ===
Cul-de-sac was awarded the 1966 Golden Bear at the 16th Berlin International Film Festival.

== See also ==
- List of films featuring home invasions
