= What? (film) =

1972 film by Roman Polanski

- Theatrical release poster
- Directed by: Roman Polanski
- Written by: Roman Polanski; Gérard Brach
- Produced by: Carlo Ponti
- Starring: Sydne Rome; Marcello Mastroianni; Hugh Griffith; Romolo Valli; Roman Polanski
- Cinematography: Marcello Gatti; Giuseppe Ruzzolini
- Edited by: Alastair McIntyre
- Music by: Claudio Gizzi
- Distributed by: NPF Planfilm
- Release date: December 7, 1972
- Running time: 110 minutes
- Countries: Italy; France; Germany
- Languages: English; Italian; French

What? (Che?, also variously titled Quoi?, Was?, and Diary of Forbidden Dreams) is a 1972 comedy film co-written and directed by Roman Polanski and starring Sydne Rome, Marcello Mastroianni, Hugh Griffith and Romolo Valli.

== Plot ==
Set in an unnamed coastal city in Italy, the film tells a story of an American girl, Nancy, who takes shelter in a villa filled with strange guests. There, she gets into a relationship with a retired pimp, Alex.

== Cast ==
- Sydne Rome as Nancy
- Marcello Mastroianni as Alex
- Hugh Griffith as Joseph Noblart
- Romolo Valli as Giovanni
- Roman Polanski as Mosquito (Uncredited)
- Guido Alberti as Priest
- Gianfranco Piacentini as Tony
- Carlo Delle Piane as Young Oaf #1 in Car
- Mario Bussolino as Young Oaf #2 in Car
- Henning Schlüter as Catone
- Christiane Barry as Dresser
- Pietro Tordi as Man-Servant
- Nerina Montagnani as Chambermaid
- Mogens von Gadow as German
- Dieter Hallervorden as German
- Elisabeth Witte as Baby
- John Karlsen as Edward
- Roger Middleton as Jimmy
- Alvaro Vitali
- Franco Pesce
- Renate Langer as Naked Girl with Hat (uncredited)

== Production ==
=== Filming ===
The film was shot on location in Amalfi, Italy, in a villa owned by the producer, Carlo Ponti. Some of the action was improvised.

== Reception ==
John Simon of the National Review described What? as a "monstrous fiasco". Roger Ebert in the Chicago Sun-Times gave an apparently-reedited version titled Diary of Forbidden Dreams a half star out of four, and said the film confirmed his "long-held suspicion that, when it comes right down to it, there's a nasty streak of misogyny in Polanski."

On Rotten Tomatoes, it holds a rating of 17% from 12 reviews.
