= Gérard Brach =

French screenwriter and film director (1927–2006)

- Born: 23 July 1927; Montrouge, Hauts-de-Seine, France
- Died: 9 September 2006 (aged 79); Paris, France
- Occupations: Screenwriter, film director
- Awards: BAFTA Award for Best Adapted Screenplay; 1986 Jean de Florette

Gérard Brach (23 July 1927 – 9 September 2006) was a French screenwriter best known for his collaborations with the film directors Roman Polanski and Jean-Jacques Annaud. He directed two movies: La Maison and Le Bateau sur l'herbe.

== Biography ==
Brach was born in Montrouge, Paris, where he grew up in poverty. At the age of 16, he was persuaded by his family to enlist in the Charlemagne division of the Waffen-SS, reportedly witnessing action at the Battle of Königsberg towards the end of World War II. (Note: Ariane Chemin claims that he enlisted in 1943 as the youngest combatant in the Charlemagne division, but as the division was not in fact established until late 1944 this is impossible. It may be true, however, that Brach had served in another unit beforehand.) After the war, he contracted tuberculosis and ended up spending five years in a sanatorium, undergoing a series of operations that left him with only one lung. While a patient at the sanatorium he befriended the Dadaist poet Benjamin Péret, who introduced him to André Breton, author of the Surrealist Manifesto and a major influence on Brach's early work.

By the late 1950s Brach had entered the film industry, undertaking a number of roles – from acting in minor parts on several films to working as a runner for the producer Pierre Roustang. The poverty he experienced at this time was such that he often let himself be locked in production offices at night so he could have a place to sleep; to kill his hunger, the Los Angeles Times later reported, he "ate baguettes laced with vinegar". From 1959 to 1962 he was employed as a publicist for Twentieth-Century Fox.

In 1959, Brach met Roman Polanski for the first time while working abroad in Poland, and began collaborating with him on a number of different projects. Both men later moved to London, where they wrote the scripts for Repulsion and Cul-de-Sac in short order. (Note: Cul-de-Sac was a reformulation of a script Polanski and Brach had written in Paris earlier in the decade, which bore the title When Katelbach Comes.) Brach remained in Britain for several years before returning to France to helm La Maison (1970), his first attempt at film direction. A year later he directed Le Bateau sur l’herbe, which starred Jean-Pierre Cassel and was nominated for the Grand Prix and the Prix du Jury at the 1971 Cannes Film Festival. Neither film made much impact at the box office. He had further success, however, with his screenplays, working alongside directors of international renown such as Jean-Jacques Annaud, Michelangelo Antonioni, Andrei Konchalovsky and Bertrand Blier.

In later years Brach suffered from intense agoraphobia, which prevented him from leaving his Paris apartment. His illness, he claimed in an interview, arrived "like a black cloud out of nowhere in the early 1980s", making him "break out in a cold sweat, shake and freeze in panic" as soon as he stepped outside. He received treatment for his affliction, but never managed to defeat it completely.

== Personal life and death ==
Brach was married twice. His first wife, with whom he had a son, divorced him in 1955. He met his second wife, Elisabeth, in 1969; they wed in Brach's bedroom eleven years later, as by this time his agoraphobia was too severe for him to marry in public. He died of heart failure on 9 September 2006 in Paris, aged 79.

== Works include ==
- 1965: Repulsion (Writer)
- 1966: Cul-de-sac (Writer)
- 1966: G.G. Passion (Writer)
- 1967: Le Bal des vampires (UK: Dance of the Vampires; US: The Fearless Vampire Killers) (Writer)
- 1967: The Two of Us (Le vieil homme et l'enfant) (Writer)
- 1968: Wonderwall (Story)
- 1969: Secret World (Writer)
- 1970: La Maison (Director and writer)
- 1971: Le Bateau sur l'herbe (The Boat on the Grass) (Director and co-writer)
- 1972: Quoi ? (What?) (Writer)
- 1976: Le Locataire (The Tenant) (Writer)
- 1978: Rêve de singe (Bye Bye Monkey) (Writer)
- 1979: Tess (Writer)
- 1979: Seeking Asylum (Writer)
- 1981: Quest for Fire (Original title: La Guerre du feu) (Writer)
- 1982: Identification of a Woman (Writer)
- 1983: My Best Friend's Girl (Writer)
- 1984: Maria's Lovers (Writer)
- 1986: Pirates (Writer)
- 1986: Jean de Florette (Writer)
- 1986: The Name of the Rose (Writer)
- 1986: Manon des Sources (US title: Manon of the Spring) (Writer)
- 1987: Shy People (Writer)
- 1988: Frantic (Writer)
- 1988: L'Ours (The Bear) (Writer)
- 1992: Bitter Moon (Writer)
- 1992: The Lover (Writer)
- 2004: Blueberry (Writer)
- 2007: His Majesty Minor (Writer)

=== Actor ===
- 1960: Breathless - Photographer (uncredited)
