= The Fat and the Lean =

1961 film

- French: Le Gros et le maigre
- Directed by: Roman Polanski
- Written by: Roman Polanski
- Starring: André Katelbach; Roman Polanski
- Cinematography: Jean-Michel Boussaguet
- Music by: Krzysztof Komeda
- Release date: 1961
- Running time: 15 minutes

The Fat and the Lean (French: Le Gros et le maigre) is a short silent, comic film starring, written and directed by Roman Polanski in 1961. Polanski shot this short film just after graduating from The National Film School in Łódź in 1959; filmed in France, it was Polanski's first film outside of Poland and his last before the international breakthrough of his 1962 debut feature, Knife in the Water. The Fat and the Lean features the music of Krzysztof Komeda, who composed the scores for all but one of the director's films between Two Men and a Wardrobe (1958) and Rosemary's Baby (1968).

== Plot ==
A barefoot slave plays a flute and beats a drum to entertain his master who rocks in a rocking chair in front of his mansion in the countryside overlooking Paris. The slave wipes his master's brow, feeds him, washes his feet, shades him from the sun with an umbrella, and holds a urinal for him, all the while longing to escape to Paris, which is visible in the distance. The slave tries to flee to Paris; the master gives the slave a goat in order to persuade him to stay. But the goat is chained to the slave's ankle, and becomes so inconvenient that the slave tries to flee once more. The master frees the goat and unfastens the chain, and the slave is so overjoyed that he remains to serve the master with renewed vigor and enthusiasm.

== Analysis ==
The inspiration for the film appears to be the master-slave relationship between Pozzo and Lucky in Samuel Beckett's Waiting for Godot. Indeed, as with many of Polanski's early short films, the influence of Beckett and the Theater of the Absurd is very strong.

The Fat and the Lean has been described Polanski's biographer, Barbara Leaming as a psychological exploration of dominance and servitude, that comments on mechanisms of power and humiliation that are present in both the master and the slave. It has been interpreted as allegorical work expressing Polanski's youthful desire to flee the repressive communist regime in postwar Poland and escape to the West. Portions of the film were featured in Marina Zenovich's controversial 2008 documentary, Roman Polanski: Wanted and Desired. In the context of the documentary, the situation depicted in The Fat in the Lean seems a bitterly ironic commentary on Polanski's legal troubles during 1977 — almost fifteen years after he had left Poland and was living and working in Los Angeles as a successful Hollywood director.
