= Morderstwo =

- Directed by: Roman Polanski
- Written by: Roman Polanski
- Cinematography: Nikola Todorow
- Release date: 1957
- Running time: 2 minutes
- Country: Poland

Morderstwo (English: Murder) is a short film written and directed by Roman Polanski in 1957. This was Polanski's first completed student short at the State Film School in Łódź, Poland. The film takes place predominantly in darkness and in one room. It introduces ideas Polanski revisited throughout his career. Alternative English-language titles for the film are Murder and A Murderer.
