= Rozbijemy zabawę =

- Directed by: Roman Polanski
- Written by: Roman Polanski
- Release date: 1957
- Running time: 8 minutes

Rozbijemy zabawę (pl. We will break up a party) was a short film written and directed by Roman Polanski in 1957. According to Roman Polanski's autobiography, the film was a stunt which nearly got him thrown out of the Łódź film school; Polanski had organized a groups of "thugs" to go to a school dance and begin disrupting it. As the band played "When the Saints Go Marching In," some students were beaten up. The ironic alternate title is "Break Up the Dance".
