= Heere Heeresma =

Dutch poet and writer (1932–2011)

- Born: 9 March 1932; Amsterdam
- Died: 26 June 2011 (aged 79); Laren
- Resting place: Zorgvlied cemetery
- Occupations: author and poet
- Writing career
- Notable works: A Day at the Beach (1962); Melancholic Stories for around the Central Heating (1973)

Simon Heere Heeresma (9 March 1932 – 26 June 2011) was a Dutch author and poet.

Heeresma was born in Amsterdam in 1932. His first collection of poetry, published in 1954, was called Children's Room, but his breakthrough came in the 1960s and 1970s in the Provo generation. Especially well received was his publication Melancholic Stories for around the Central Heating of 1973. A Day at the Beach (1962) was made into a movie twice: first in 1970 by Simon Hesera (A Day at the Beach) and in 1984 by Dutch cineast Theo van Gogh. Heeresma died in Laren in 2011, aged 79. He is buried at Zorgvlied cemetery.

== Bibliography ==
- Children's Room (1954)
- A Day at the Beach (1962)
- The Fish (1963)
- Jewels of Water Paint (1965)
- The corruption of the Swieps (1967)
- Pass me the mug, Jet! (1968)
- Hip hip hip for the Antichrist (1969)
- At Last in Dublin (1969)
- Han de Wit goes into Development Aid (1972)
- Melancholic Stories for around the Central Heating (1973)
- Once and Never Again... (1979)
- A Hot Ice Salon (1982)
- Happy Couples (1984)
- Shaved Shame (1987)
- Totally Heeresma (1997)

== Publications ==
- These verses and poems, that poetry too (1974)
- Totally Heeresma (1978)
- Autobiographical (1983)
