= Gilbert Taylor =

British cinematographer (1914–2013)

- Taylor with George Lucas filming Star Wars
- Born: 12 April 1914; Bushey Heath, Hertfordshire, England
- Died: 23 August 2013 (aged 99); Newport, Isle of Wight, England
- Other name: Gil Taylor
- Years active: 1930–1997
- Spouse: Dee Vaughan (m. 1967)
- Children: 4

Gilbert Taylor, B.S.C. (12 April 1914 – 23 August 2013), sometimes credited as Gil Taylor, was an English cinematographer. He had notable collaborations with directors Stanley Kubrick, Roman Polanski, Richard Lester, J. Lee Thompson, and the Boulting brothers, as well as George Lucas on the original Star Wars (1977).

He was nominated for the BAFTA Award for Best Cinematography twice, for Repulsion (1965) and Cul-de-sac (1966), both directed by Polanski. A founding member of the British Society of Cinematographers, Taylor received the Society's Lifetime Achievement Award in 2001.

== Early life ==
The son of a Hertfordshire builder, Taylor grew up in Bushey Heath. A paternal uncle was a newsreel cameraman and contact with him from the age of ten gave Taylor early experience of working with cameras and developing film stock. As a teenager, he studied architecture before deciding to pursue a career in film. While his father disapproved of the film industry, populated he thought by "harridans, whores and gypsies", it was his mother who consented to their son's altered career plans.

A neighbour offered Taylor, aged 15, a job as a camera assistant to William Shenton, a cinematographer working for Gainsborough Studios at their Islington base. In 1929, Taylor worked on the studio's final two silent films. Shenton took Taylor to Paris where he worked on two more silent films, before returning to Gainsborough. He then worked at Elstree for British International Pictures, where he was clapper loader on the Alfred Hitchcock film Number Seventeen (1932). Despite his junior status, formally a second camera assistant, Taylor was entrusted with some of the special effects work, including the use of mattes, to disguise the roofs of poorly maintained buildings.

=== Military service ===
During six years service in World War II as an officer in the Royal Air Force Volunteer Reserve, he became an operational cameraman flying in Avro Lancaster bombers, documenting the damage after British bombing raids. Taylor recalled: "This was requested by Winston Churchill, and my material was delivered to 10 Downing Street for him to view. He was keen for the public to see what our lads were doing. I did 10 of those operations, including raids on Cologne and Dresden".

== Career ==
After demobilisation, he worked for Two Cities Films. In Fame Is the Spur (1947), he worked on a dream sequence using deep focus. The Boulting brothers were the co-producers of the film and they placed Taylor under contract. For the Boultings, Taylor, now promoted to full cinematographer, or director of photography, shot The Guinea Pig (US, The Outsider, 1948), Seven Days to Noon (1950) and High Treason (1951). From this point, Taylor began to use bounced and reflected light gaining a more naturalistic look, whereas the use of direct light was still the common practice by his contemporaries. Because it was necessary for London to look unpopulated in Seven Days to Noon, the first of three "end of the world films" Taylor worked on, it was necessary for him to arise at five-o-clock in the morning during a seven-week shoot.

=== Kubrick, Lester and Polanski ===
Taylor worked on a number of films commended for their black and white photography, such as Stanley Kubrick's Dr. Strangelove and Richard Lester's A Hard Day's Night (both 1964). Taylor, without Kubrick who was unwilling to fly in an aircraft, filmed material in the Arctic to be used as background plates in the flying sequences.

He commented later: "Strangelove was at the time a unique experience because the lighting was to be incorporated in the sets, with little or no other light used". Concerning the war room set designed by Ken Adam: "Lighting that set was sheer magic, and I don’t quite know how I got away with it all". He continued: "Much of it was the same formula based on the overheads as fill and blasting in the key on faces from the side". Although Kubrick and Taylor had a rapport, he found the director to be autocratic. An easier project to work on was the Richard Lester film with The Beatles which was heavily improvised.

With Lester, Chris Pizzello wrote in 2003, Taylor "adopted a roving, multiple-camera technique (aided by new, versatile 10:1 zoom lenses) so that the Beatles could move about freely and not worry about technicalities like hitting marks. This fast, fresh brand of filmmaking was a perfect fit for the film’s tiny budget, tight schedule and simple black-and-white aesthetic". Taylor and five other operators on the film used hand-held Arriflex cameras. "The key is not to hold the camera completely still", he once commented "but to let it 'breathe' with you, to move with it".

His work on Dr Strangelove led Roman Polanski to seek Taylor for Repulsion (1965). In committing to the Polish director's first English-language film, Taylor rejected the opportunity to work on a Bond film (Thunderball) because he thought Polanski "was a very interesting guy". According to Polanski in his 1984 autobiography, Repulsion's executive producer Michael Klinger "protested that Gil Taylor was one of the most expensive cameramen in the business, but I held out for Taylor and I got him". Taylor said his "aim was to get a stronger negative and good shadows in the final print. The shadows are what make good movies".

Their collaboration continued with Cul-de-sac (1966) and Macbeth (1971), the third and last film he shot with Polanski. According to Ronald Bergan, "although shot in colour", Macbeth, "is as near to black and white as possible, with its grey, misty landscape". Taylor received BAFTA nominations over two consecutive years for the first two collaborations.

=== Later work in colour ===
Hitchcock requested Taylor work on his penultimate film Frenzy (1972). Despite a claim in Bergan's obituary of the cinematographer that Hitchcock was unaware the two men had worked together forty years earlier, according to Taylor they had stayed in touch. Hitchcock never looked through the camera, because of his use of storyboards, leaving decisions to Taylor. The tracking shot, up and down a flight of stairs and then into the street, which invisibly merged shots from a studio set and street location took a day to achieve with the switch disguised by the movement of an extra in front of the camera.

Taylor's later films include The Omen (1976), and Star Wars (1977). On Star Wars, he established principles about visual aesthetics which have been maintained in the later films in the series. He told Mark Newbold in 2005:

"I wanted to give Star Wars a unique visual style that would distinguish it from other films in the science fiction genre. I wanted Star Wars to have clarity because I think space isn’t out of focus, also I was mindful that there was an enormous amount of process work to be done in America with Dykstra after we had finished shooting in England, and a crisp result would help this process".

Taylor found George Lucas an elusive person to consult, leading Taylor to make his own decisions as how to shoot the picture after multiple readings of the script. Differences of opinion between the director and cinematographer led to 20th Century Fox, for whom Taylor had shot The Omen, intervening to retain him on the picture. After the experience of working on Star Wars, Taylor decided he would never work again with Lucas.

His last film credit was Don't Get Me Started released in 1994, but he continued to work on commercials for some time afterwards.

Taylor was a founder member of the British Society of Cinematographers, receiving their lifetime achievement award in 2001. He received an international award from the American Society of Cinematographers (ASC) in 2006.

== Personal life ==
Taylor met his wife, former script supervisor Dee Vaughan, while both were working on comedian Tony Hancock's film, The Punch and Judy Man (1963), and married in 1967. The couple had a son and daughter. Taylor also had a son and daughter from an earlier marriage.

=== Death ===
Taylor died on 23 August 2013, aged 99, at his home on the Isle of Wight.

== Filmography ==
=== Film ===
Year	Title	Director	Notes
1948	The Guinea Pig	Roy Boulting	
1950	Seven Days to Noon	John Boulting; Roy Boulting	
1951	High Treason	Roy Boulting	
1952	The Yellow Balloon	J. Lee Thompson	
1953	Single-Handed	Roy Boulting	
1954	Front Page Story	Gordon Parry	
1954	The Weak and the Wicked	J. Lee Thompson	
1954	Seagulls Over Sorrento	John Boulting; Roy Boulting	
1954	Trouble in the Glen	Herbert Wilcox	Uncredited
1955	As Long as They're Happy	J. Lee Thompson	
1955	Josephine and Men	Roy Boulting	
1956	Yield to the Night	J. Lee Thompson	
1956	It's Great to Be Young	Cyril Frankel	
1956	The Silken Affair	Roy Kellino	
1956	My Wife's Family	Gilbert Gunn	
1957	The Good Companions	J. Lee Thompson	
1957	Woman in a Dressing Gown	J. Lee Thompson	
1957	No Time for Tears	Cyril Frankel	
1958	Ice Cold in Alex	J. Lee Thompson	
1958	She Didn't Say No!	Cyril Frankel	
1958	Alive and Kicking	Cyril Frankel	
1959	No Trees in the Street	J. Lee Thompson	
1959	Operation Bullshine	Gilbert Gunn	
1959	Tommy the Toreador	John Paddy Carstairs	
1960	Bottoms Up	Mario Zampi	
1960	Sands of the Desert	John Paddy Carstairs	
1961	The Full Treatment	Val Guest	
1961	The Rebel	Robert Day	
1961	Petticoat Pirates	David MacDonald	
1962	It's Trad, Dad!	Richard Lester	
1962	A Prize of Arms	Cliff Owen	With Gerald Gibbs
1963	The Punch and Judy Man	Jeremy Summers	
1964	Dr. Strangelove	Stanley Kubrick	
1964	Hide and Seek	Cy Endfield	
1964	A Hard Day's Night	Richard Lester	
1965	Ferry Cross the Mersey	Jeremy Summers	
1965	Repulsion	Roman Polanski	
1965	The Bedford Incident	James B. Harris	
1966	Cul-de-sac	Roman Polanski	
1967	Theatre of Death	Samuel Gallu	
1967	The Man Outside	Samuel Gallu	
1968	Work Is a Four-Letter Word	Peter Hall	
1968	Before Winter Comes	J. Lee Thompson	
1969	A Nice Girl Like Me	Desmond Davis	With Manny Wynn
1970	A Day at the Beach	Simon Hesera	
1970	Quackser Fortune Has a Cousin in the Bronx	Waris Hussein	
1971	Macbeth	Roman Polanski	
1972	Frenzy	Alfred Hitchcock	
1974	Soft Beds, Hard Battles	Roy Boulting	
1976	The Omen	Richard Donner	
1977	Star Wars	George Lucas	
1979	Escape to Athena	George P. Cosmatos	
1979	Meetings with Remarkable Men	Peter Brook	
1979	Dracula	John Badham	
1980	Flash Gordon	Mike Hodges	
1981	Green Ice	Ernest Day	
1981	Venom	Piers Haggard	
1982	Losin' It	Curtis Hanson	
1984	Lassiter	Roger Young	
1984	Voyage of the Rock Aliens	James Fargo	
1987	The Bedroom Window	Curtis Hanson	
1994	Don't Get Me Started	Arthur Ellis	

=== Television ===
Director

Year	Title	Notes
1969	Department S	Episode "The Man from X"

Cinematographer

Year	Title	Notes
1965	The Man in a Looking Glass	TV movie, combination of episodes of The Baron series
1966-67	The Baron	13 episodes
1966-69	The Avengers	8 episodes
1969	Randall and Hopkirk (Deceased)	Episode "My Late Lamented Friend and Partner"
1972-73	Pathfinders	4 episodes
1973	The New-Fangled Wandering Minstrel Show	TV special
1978	Breaking Up	TV movie

== Awards and nominations ==
Institution	Year	Category	Work	Result
American Society of Cinematographers	2006	International Award	—N/a	Nominated
BAFTA Awards	1965	Best Cinematography (Black-and-White)	Repulsion	Nominated
BAFTA Awards	1966	Best Cinematography (Black-and-White)	Cul-de-sac	Nominated
British Society of Cinematographers	2001	Lifetime Achievement Award	—N/a	Won
Saturn Awards	1978	Outstanding Cinematographer	Star Wars	Nominated
