= Repulsion (film) =

1965 British film by Roman Polanski

- Theatrical release poster
- Directed by: Roman Polanski
- Screenplay by: Roman Polanski; Gérard Brach; David Stone (Note: Adaptation and additional dialogue)
- Story by: Roman Polanski; Gérard Brach
- Produced by: Gene Gutowski
- Starring: Catherine Deneuve; Ian Hendry; John Fraser; Patrick Wymark; Yvonne Furneaux
- Cinematography: Gilbert Taylor
- Edited by: Alastair McIntyre
- Music by: Chico Hamilton
- Production companies: Compton Films; Tekli British Productions
- Distributed by: Compton Films
- Release date: 10 June 1965 (United Kingdom)
- Running time: 105 minutes
- Country: United Kingdom
- Language: English
- Budget: £65,000
- Box office: $3.1 million

Repulsion is a 1965 British psychological horror thriller film directed by Roman Polanski, and starring Catherine Deneuve. Based on a story written by Polanski and Gérard Brach, the plot follows Carol, a withdrawn, disturbed young woman who, when left alone in the apartment she shares with her sister, is subject to a number of nightmarish experiences. The film focuses on the point of view of Carol and her vivid hallucinations and nightmares as she comes into contact with men and their desires for her. Ian Hendry, John Fraser, Patrick Wymark, and Yvonne Furneaux appear in supporting roles.

Shot in London, it is Polanski's first English-language film and second feature-length production, following Knife in the Water (1962).

The film debuted at the 1965 Cannes Film Festival before receiving theatrical releases internationally. Upon its release, Repulsion received considerable critical acclaim and has been called one of Polanski's greatest works. The film was nominated for a BAFTA Award for Gilbert Taylor's cinematography.

== Plot ==
Carol Ledoux, a shy Belgian manicurist, lives in London with her older sister Helen. Carol is remarkably detached and struggles in her daily interactions. A suitor, Colin, is enamoured of her and makes fervent attempts to court her, but Carol seems uninterested. Carol is troubled by Helen's relationship with a married man named Michael, whom Carol seems to dislike. She is bothered by his habit of leaving his razor and toothbrush in her glass in the bathroom, and at night struggles to sleep, bothered by the sounds of her sister and Michael having sex.

When Carol walks home from work one day, she is bothered by a crack in the pavement. Colin happens upon her and she struggles to converse with him. He drives her home and tries to kiss her several times, but she pulls away, running upstairs and vigorously brushing her teeth before weeping. That night, Helen questions Carol for dumping Michael's toothbrush and shaver in the bathroom trash bin. At the salon, Carol becomes increasingly distant, barely talking to her coworkers and customers, so much so that her boss decides to send her home for the day.

That night, Helen and Michael depart for Italy on holiday, leaving Carol alone in the apartment. Carol takes a rabbit out of the fridge for dinner. Instead of cooking it, she is distracted by a number of Michael's possessions left around the apartment, including an unwashed shirt whose odour makes her vomit. After trying on one of her sister's dresses, Carol sees a dark figure in the mirror. That night, she hears footsteps outside her bedroom. Carol's isolation begins to take its toll on her, and she misses three days of work. One morning, she runs a bath and walks away, causing it to overflow. As she turns on a light, the wall cracks open. She locks herself in her room and again hears footsteps. This time, she hallucinates that a man breaks into her room and rapes her. She is awakened in the hallway by a phone call from Colin, but she hangs up.

After returning to the salon, Carol cuts the finger of a client while giving a manicure, and is told to go home early. A concerned coworker finds the uncooked rabbit's head in Carol's purse. At the apartment, Carol stares at an old family photo and the wall behind the photograph shatters like a mirror. Colin subsequently arrives at the apartment, but Carol refuses to open the door so he breaks in. He declares his love for her, and she responds by bludgeoning him to death with a candlestick. She cleans the blood, barricades the front door, and places Colin's corpse in the bathtub. In bed, she experiences the same rape hallucination. She wakes up the next morning, naked on the floor. In a subsequent scene, she walks down the dark hallway of her apartment where hands appear out of the walls and grab her. Later, the angry wife of Michael calls looking for Helen, causing Carol to cut the wire of the telephone.

The landlord arrives to collect Carol and Helen's rent. After he is unable to get in due to the barricade, he breaks into the apartment and sees Carol. She pays him the rent, but he is disgusted by the state of the apartment. He sees the uncooked rabbit, still sitting out, rotting. He propositions Carol, offering to forget about the rent if she "takes care of him", and tries to rape her when she does not respond. She pushes him off and then hacks him to death with Michael's straight razor. She then sinks deeper into hallucination.

When Helen and Michael arrive home, Helen is dismayed at the state of the place. Michael happens on Helen hyperventilating and finds Colin's dead body in the bath. Helen finds Carol under her bed in a catatonic state. Her neighbours flood in as Michael picks her up and carries her out, smiling. In the living room, a family photo—the one Carol pondered earlier—shows Carol as a child, possibly staring at an older male family member in the photograph with a look of loathing, while others in the photo smile for the camera.

== Cast ==
- Catherine Deneuve as Carol Ledoux
- Ian Hendry as Michael
- John Fraser as Colin
- Yvonne Furneaux as Helen Ledoux
- Patrick Wymark as landlord
- Renée Houston as Miss Balch
- Valerie Taylor as Madame Denise
- James Villiers as John
- Helen Fraser as Bridget
- Hugh Futcher as Reggie
- Monica Merlin as Mrs. Rendlesham
- Imogen Graham as manicurist
- Mike Pratt as workman
- Maxwell Craig as workman

== Analysis ==
The film is unusual for featuring a female killer. It explores the repulsion Carol feels about sexuality in general and her suitors' pursuit of her in particular.

It has been suggested that the film hints that her father may have sexually abused her as a child, which is the basis of her neuroses and breakdown. Other critics have observed Carol's repeated usage of items related to her sister's boyfriend Michael, and his presence greatly provoking Carol at the beginning of the film.

The film also approaches the theme of boundary breaking, with Tamar McDonald stating that she saw Carol as refusing to conform to the expected "path of femininity". It increasingly adopts the perspective of its protagonist. The dream sequences are particularly intense.

Repulsion was considered the first installment in Polanski's "Apartment Trilogy", followed by Rosemary's Baby (1968) and The Tenant (1976), both of which are horror films that also take place primarily inside apartment buildings.

== Production ==
=== Development ===
The story for Repulsion was conceived by Roman Polanski and Gérard Brach, who wrote an outline of the script in Paris. Polanski, who had recently relocated from his native Poland to the United Kingdom, decided to set the film in London. According to Polanski, the inspiration for the screenplay was derived from a woman of whom he and Brach were mutual acquaintances, and who Polanski later learned suffered from schizophrenia.

Polanski and Brach pitched the film to numerous English studios, including British Lion Films and Paramount Pictures, but each passed on the project. They eventually proposed the project to Compton Films, a small English-based studio known for making exploitation films and softcore pornography. The two leading executives at Compton Films, Michael Klinger and Tony Tenser, were impressed by the screenplay, and agreed to help produce and distribute the film.

=== Casting ===
Deneuve, who had just finished a starring role in The Umbrellas of Cherbourg the year before, was cast in the lead role of Carol.

=== Filming ===
According to Polanski, the film was shot on a modest budget of £65,000. The film's exterior sequences were shot in the South Kensington district of London, while interiors of Carol and Helen's mansion flat were constructed on a small lot at Twickenham Studios. In order to capture an authentic appearance the film's art director, Seamus Flannery, and the cinematographer, Gilbert Taylor, photographed the interiors of a number of real local flats shared by young women in a seedy section of South Kensington. Commenting on the appearance of the flat, Polanski biographer Christopher Sandford notes: "Unlike the usual heavy-handed representation of a London pad, the detail and observations of the place are exactly right; you can believe that two foreign girls would end up there."

Filming was challenging for Polanski as he was unfamiliar with the London shooting locations, and both he and star Deneuve were not fluent in English. Additionally, Polanski was meticulous about shots: Michael Klinger recalled witnessing Polanski shoot a simple frame of Deneuve's hand twenty-seven times. The production eventually went over-budget, partly due to Polanski's perfectionistic tendencies, totaling approximately £95,000 as opposed to the budgeted £65,000.

Tensions flared between Polanski and some of the cast during the shoot, including Yvonne Furneaux, whom Polanski treated harshly. Klinger recounted that, after remonstrating with Polanski for his treatment of Furneaux, he responded: "I know she's a nice girl. She's too bloody nice. She's supposed to be playing a bitch. Every day I have to make her into a bitch." Additionally, Ian Hendry, who portrayed Michael, would frequently return to the set after lunch intoxicated, making him difficult to direct.

== Soundtrack ==
The film was scored by Chico Hamilton. The official "soundtrack" was issued on CD in 2008 by British label Harkit, which specialised in British soundtracks from the 60's. Some songs on the soundtrack are not even heard in the film, such as "Seduction in the Dark" and "Repulsion Nocturne."

The main track from the film is called "Carol's Walk". The song also features on Hamilton's album Chic Chic Chico.

== Release ==
Repulsion had its theatrical debut in London on 10 June 1965.

=== Critical response ===
Film critic Bosley Crowther of The New York Times gave the film a positive review stating, "An absolute knockout of a movie in the psychological horror line has been accomplished by Roman Polanski in his first English-language film." Jim Emerson, filling in for Roger Ebert of the Chicago Sun-Times, included the film in his list entitled "102 Movies You Must See Before...".

Upon the film's release to DVD, Dave Kehr reviewed the film for The New York Times praising the film's techniques and themes, saying, "Mr. Polanski uses slow camera movements, a soundtrack carefully composed of distracting, repetitive noises (clocks ticking, bells ringing, hearts thumping) and, once Carol barricades herself in the cramped, dark apartment, explicitly expressionistic effects (cracks suddenly ripping through walls, rough hands reaching out of the darkness to grope her) to depict a plausible schizophrenic episode."

Review aggregator Rotten Tomatoes reports that 95% of 64 film critics have given the film a positive review, with a rating average of 8.87/10. The website's critics consensus states, "Roman Polanski's first English film follows a schizophrenic woman's descent into madness, and makes the audience feel as claustrophobic as the character." As of June 2019, the film is number 52 on Rotten Tomatoes' list of best rated films. Metacritic, which assigns a weighted average score out of 100 to reviews from mainstream critics, gives the film a score of 91 based on eight reviews.

=== Accolades ===
At the 15th Berlin International Film Festival in 1965, Repulsion won both the FIPRESCI Prize and the Silver Berlin Bear-Extraordinary Jury Prize. The film was also nominated for a BAFTA for Best Black and White Cinematography.

=== Home media ===
In 2009, the film was released as part of The Criterion Collection on DVD and Blu-ray. Both releases contain two documentary featurettes, audio commentary by Roman Polanski and Catherine Deneuve, original trailers, and a 16-page booklet.
