= Hands Up! (1981 film) =

1981 Polish film

- Theatrical release poster
- Directed by: Jerzy Skolimowski
- Written by: Jerzy Skolimowski; Andrzej Kostenko
- Produced by: Film Polski; Zespól Filmowy Syrena
- Starring: Jerzy Skolimowski; Tadeusz Łomnicki; Joanna Szcerbic; Adam Hanuszkiewicz; Bogumił Kobiela
- Cinematography: Andrzej Kostenko; Witold Sobociński
- Edited by: Grazyna Jasinska-Wisniarowska; Jadwiga Ignatczenko; Zenon Piórecki
- Music by: Krzysztof Komeda
- Release dates: 1981; (originally filmed in 1967: withheld by censors; re-edited with introduction in 1981)
- Running time: 80 minutes (1981); 76 minutes (re-edited 1985)
- Country: Poland
- Language: Polish

Hands Up! (Polish: Ręce do góry) is a Polish drama film directed by Jerzy Skolimowski. It is the third of a series of semi-autobiographical films in which Skolimowski himself plays his alter ego Andrzej Leszczyc. Originally filmed in 1967, Hands Up! was banned at the time in communist Poland because it critiqued Nazism in Poland, the Stalinist past in post-World War II Poland, and the socio-political climate in sixties Poland. The communist authorities not only banned the film, but also effectively sent Skolimowski into a lengthy exile.

It wasn't until 14 years after the original film was made that Polish censors allowed it to be re-edited with recent footage as an introduction. This released version was screened out of competition at the 1981 Cannes Film Festival. However, it was shelved in Poland and not screened there until 1985.

== Plot ==
Skolimowski continues the story of his alter ego, Andrzej Leszczyc, from Walkover (1965). The original 1967 version of Hands Up! is a surrealistic reunion of Leszczyc and four former colleagues in an abandoned railway wagon. Their reunion becomes a sombre reflection on both Poland's past and possible future.

Leszczyc, who has apparently become a veterinary surgeon, and his former student colleagues refer to themselves by the makes of the cars they own. Leszczyc owns a Zastawa, one owns a Wartburg, the others own more upmarket models such as an Opel Rekord or the Alfa Romeo owned by the unhappily married couple. Supposedly taking speed (although it is later revealed the pills are a placebo), and carousing in the cattle truck of a freight train, the group offers various satirical sidelights on Polish society of the 1960s. Brief flashbacks of the students together include a scene of them hoisting a large image of a four-eyed Stalin. As light dims in the railway car, candles illuminate the darkness and the characters reflect that the cattle truck may have been one of those in which the former generation (i.e.-Jews during the Holocaust) were transported during World War II to the Nazi death camps.

== Cast ==
- Jerzy Skolimowski as Andrzej Leszczyc (Zastava)
- Joanna Szczerbic as Alfa
- Tadeusz Łomnicki as Opel Rekord
- Adam Hanuszkiewicz as Romeo
- Bogumil Kobiela as Wartburg

== Production ==
=== Filming and editing ===
Hands Up! was originally made in 1967 in monochrome by Zespól Filmowy Syrena (pl) studio. Skolimowski said about the film in 1968 for Sight and Sound, "It is a provocation about political and social problems in Poland: a black film, not very explicit, with lots of allusions. The story line is realistic and non-realistic at the same time, but difficult to talk about. It is a kind of trip in the imagination." Skolimowski said about using the metaphor of a cattle truck, "[Leszczyc] is travelling in a truck which is normally used only for cattle, and which was also used for the transportation of prisoners to the concentration camps during the war."

Witold Sobociński's cinematography for the 1967 film, his first, has been noted for creating a rhythmic sense of mood and light, especially in the transformational space of the dark freight train.

The 1967 film was withdrawn from the Venice Film Festival. During the briefly liberalised climate of Poland's Solidarity movement, Skolimowski was invited to update Hands Up! and "re-release the film" in 1981, prompting Skolimowski to seize upon the abrupt relaxation of censorship.

In a 25-minute section (filmed in colour) added by Skolimowski in 1981, he explains how the original was withheld by Polish censors of the time and that this was a principal cause of his leaving his country; however following liberalisation in Poland, he was invited to resuscitate it. The introduction includes, apart from some fictional apocalyptic passages, shots of Beirut ruined by the civil wars of the 1970s, where Skolimowski is working as an actor on Volker Schlöndorff's German film Die Fälschung (Circle of Deceit), and also shots of London featuring demonstrations in favour of Solidarność, Speaker's Corner, and an exhibition of Skolimowski's own paintings. These sections include cameo roles by Bruno Ganz, David Essex, Mike Sarne, Alan Bates, Jane Asher and others. The final credits show the actors as they are in 1981, with the exception of Bogumił Kobiela, who died in 1969.

The 80-minute 1981 release of Hands Up! that screened at Cannes was shelved by Polish censors. When the film was finally screened in Poland in 1985, it was edited down to 76 minutes.

=== Music ===
Krzysztof Komeda composed the original music. Other music used for the film was by Polish composers Krzysztof Penderecki and Józef Skrzek. Some of the music in the introduction is from Penderecki's 1970 choral work Kosmogonia.

== Reception ==
Senses of Cinema wrote, "It has been suggested that the 1981 footage adds or clarifies little with regard to the original 1967 work, but the relationship between the two sections is, in fact, revealing because of these apparent fissures ... The implication is that there are discreet, mutually exclusive worlds meeting and competing in the film, and that these will structure the proceeding narrative. Indeed, it is specifically a nexus of incompatibilities that animate the 1967 drama: between past and present, between collective and individual responsibility."

Polish film scholar Ewa Mazierska said that Skolimowski's presence in the 1981 "Prologue" offered him the opportunity to "look at Hands Up!, filmmaking and his condition as a director and exiled Pole from the distance of fourteen years separating the two versions of the film. In this diary the 'old' Hands Up! is just one of the many elements filling the artist's life, along with travelling, exhibiting paintings in his flat, meeting friends and realising new cinematic projects." She also said that both the 1967 and 1981 versions of Hands Up! position Skolimowski as a "politically opposition filmmaker" and "Polish opposition artist."
