= Jerzy Skolimowski =

Polish film director, screenwriter, dramatist and actor (born 1938)

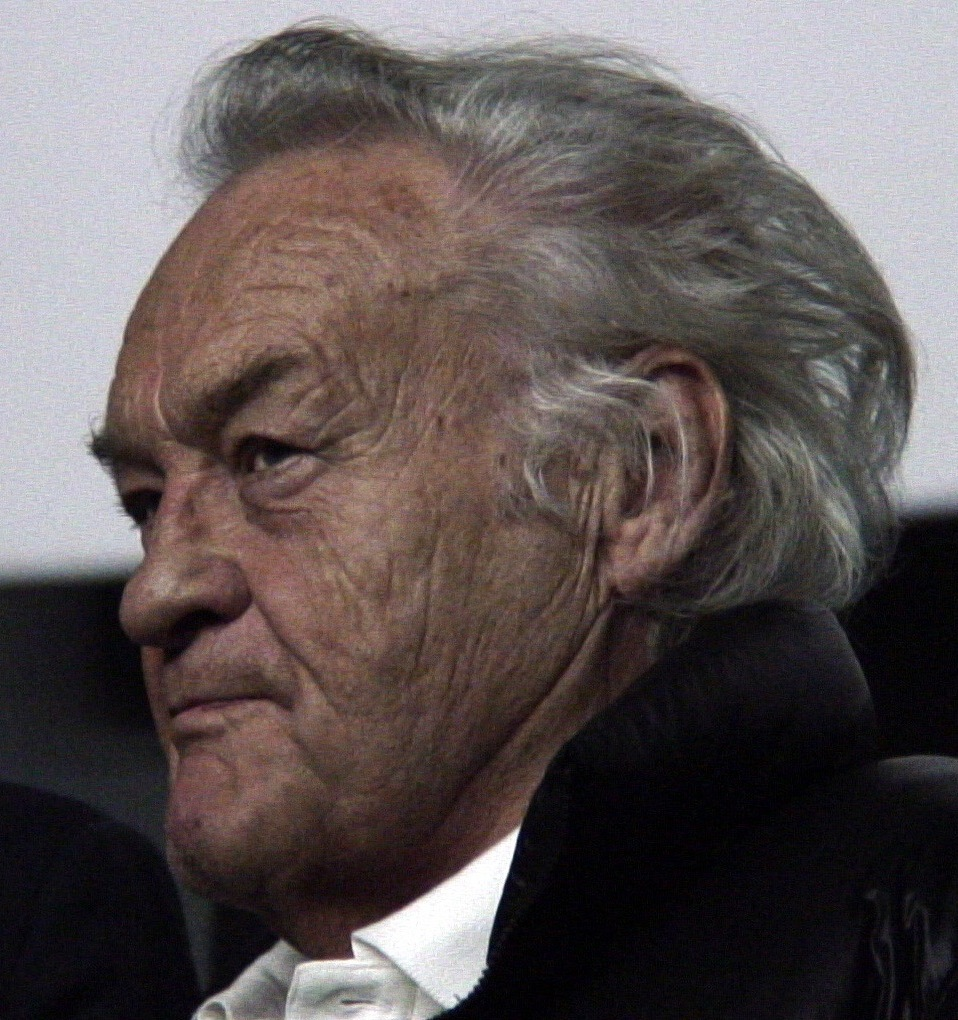
- Skolimowski at the 10th Lisbon & Estoril Film Festival in 2016
- Born: 5 May 1938 (age 88); Łódź, Poland
- Education: Łódź Film School
- Occupations: Filmmaker, director, screenwriter, actor, painter
- Years active: 1960–present
- Spouses: Elżbieta Czyżewska (m. 1958; div. 1965) Joanna Szczerbic (m. 1966; died 2014): Ewa Piaskowska
- Children: 2

Jerzy Skolimowski (Polish: [ˈjɛʐɨ skɔliˈmɔfskʲi]; born 5 May 1938) is a Polish film director, screenwriter, dramatist, actor and painter. Beginning as a screenwriter for Andrzej Wajda's Innocent Sorcerers (1960), Skolimowski has made more than twenty films since his directorial debut The Menacing Eye (1960). In 1967 he was awarded the Golden Bear prize for his Belgian film The Departure (1967). Among his other notable films is Barrier (1966) Deep End (1970), starring Jane Asher and John Moulder Brown; The Shout (1978), starring Alan Bates, Susannah York and John Hurt; Moonlighting (1982), starring Jeremy Irons; and Essential Killing (2010), starring Vincent Gallo.

He lived in Los Angeles for over 20 years where he painted in a figurative, expressionist mode and occasionally acted in films. He returned to Poland, and to filmmaking as a writer and director, after a 17-year hiatus with Four Nights with Anna (2008).

He received the Golden Lion Award for Lifetime Achievement at the 2016 Venice Film Festival. His film EO (2022) was awarded the Jury Prize at the Cannes Film Festival and was nominated for the Academy Award for Best International Feature Film at the 95th Academy Awards.

== Early life ==
Skolimowski was born in Łódź, Poland, the son of Maria (née Postnikoff) and Stanisław Skolimowski, an architect. He often recognized indications in his work to a childhood ineradicably scarred by the war. His early childhood was dominated by the Nazi occupation of Poland; at one point he was rescued from the rubble of a bombed-out house in Warsaw. His father, a member of the Polish Resistance, was executed by the Nazis. His mother hid a Polish Jewish family in the house, and Skolimowski recalls being required to take candy from German soldiers to maintain appearances.

After the war, his mother became the cultural attaché of the Polish embassy in Prague. His fellow pupils at school in Poděbrady, a spa town near Prague, included future film-makers Miloš Forman and Ivan Passer, as well as Václav Havel.

Skolimowski was considered a troublemaker in school for his frequent pranks. In college he studied ethnography, history, and literature and took up boxing, which later became the subject of his first film, Identification Marks: None. Skolimowski's interest in jazz and association with composer Krzysztof Komeda brought him into contact with actor Zbigniew Cybulski and directors Andrzej Munk and Roman Polanski.

== Career ==
=== Writing and acting ===
In his early twenties Skolimowski had already a written several books of poems, short stories, and a play. During this period Skolimowski met Andrzej Wajda, the leading director of the then dominant 'Polish school' and twelve years his senior. Wajda showed him a script for a film about youth written by Jerzy Andrzejewski, the author of Ashes and Diamonds. Skolimowski was not impressed and dismissed the script. However, in response to a challenge by Wajda, he produced his own version which became a basis for the finished film, Innocent Sorcerers (1960), directed by Wajda with Skolimowski playing a boxer. Skolimowski then collaborated with Polański, writing the dialogue for the script of Knife in the Water (1962).

=== Film transition ===
Skolimowski enrolled in the Łódź Film School with the intention of avoiding the long apprenticeship required before graduating to feature film direction. With the advice of Andrzej Munk, Skolimowski shot his student films over the course of several years in such a way that he could later re-edit them into a feature-length film. While scoring poorly in actual coursework, Skolimowski had completed his first film, Rysopis by the time he graduated.

Aside from writing, directing, and editing Rysopis, Skolimowski also starred as Andrzej Leszczyc, a character sometimes described as his alter ego and the first film in his "Polish Sextet". He reprised the role in his second film, Walkover, which earned Skolimowski early praise from Jean-Luc Godard. Skolimowski's third film, Barrier, contained similar autobiographical elements, but starred his wife, Joanna Szczerbic, and Jan Nowicki. It also marked his first collaboration with his old friend, Krzystof Komeda, and won the Grand Prix at Bergamo International Film Festival.

Skolimowski's early success allowed him to travel to Belgium to make Le Départ, a French-language comedy starring Jean-Pierre Léaud and again featuring a score by Komeda. Skolimowski described Le Départ as a light film rather than a comedy, stating that it "does not have the serious layers that I like in my work." Nevertheless, Skolimowski won the Golden Bear for the film at the 17th Berlin International Film Festival, and the film was selected as Belgium's entry for the Academy Award for Best Foreign Language Film at the 40th Academy Awards. Skolimowski then travelled to Czechoslovakia where he contributed a segment to a Czech-produced portmanteau film, Dialóg 20-40-60, in which three different directors (with Zbyněk Brynych and Peter Solan) each devised their own story using identical dialogue even though the central characters in each section are separated in age by twenty years. His segment reunited him with his wife Szczerbic and Léaud.

Following his critical acclaim abroad, Skolimowski returned to Poland to make Ręce do góry (Hands Up!), the third film in which he played his alter-ego Andrzej Leszczyc, his third film scored by Komeda, and the fourth entry in his Polish sextet. The anti-Stalinist themes of Hands Up! led the government to ban the film and effectively expel Skolimowski from then-communist Poland. Gene Gutowski, the Polish émigré producer who had produced Knife in the Water, hired Skolimowski to direct The Adventures of Gerard, an adaptation of Sir Arthur Conan Doyle's Brigadier Gerard stories starring Claudia Cardinale and Peter McEnery in the title role. The film was a financial failure, and Skolimowski later called it "my worst movie".

During post-production, Skolimowski resettled in London, where Jimi Hendrix was a neighbor in the same building. There he wrote Deep End, his second non-Polish feature based on his original screenplay. Deep End was critically well-received, and it introduced him to a new, English-language audience. Its success led producer David L. Wolper to hire Skolimowski to adapt King, Queen, Knave by Vladimir Nabokov. The Film reunited Skolimowski with Deep End's star, John Moulder-Brown, and starred David Niven and Gina Lollobrigida, but it did not replicate the earlier film's success. Skolimowski would not make another film until 1978, when producer Jeremy Thomas hired him to direct The Shout. The Shout, based on a short story by Robert Graves and starring Alan Bates, Susannah York, and John Hurt, was initially met with a mixed critical reception. However, it has since come to be regarded as one of Skolimowski's finest achievements and in 2026 was re-released on Blu-ray by The Criterion Collection. Afterwards, Skolimowski gave his first performance in more than a decade when the German director Volker Schlondorff hired him to play a supporting role in Circle of Deceit. The film was shot on location in Lebanon amidst the Lebanese Civil War, and Skolimowski won the Deutscher Filmpreis for best supporting actor.

Following a period of economic unrest and political agitation, the Polish government allowed Skolimowski to release Hands Up! after 14 years of suppression. Skolimowski removed around a third of the film and replaced it with a 25-minute prologue in which Skolimowski described the conditions of the film's production and eventual completion and showed footage of his paintings and his time in Lebanon. After 14 years, the film finally made its debut at the 1981 Cannes Film Festival, only for its Polish release to be delayed for four years by the implementation of Martial Law in Poland. In response, Skolimowski hurriedly wrote and directed Moonlighting, which was inspired by his real experiences with Polish citizens stranded in London and starred Jeremy Irons as a character based on himself. Moonlighting was the fifth of Skolimowski's Polish sextet, and it was critically and commercially his most successful film. This inspired him to make what would become the final and most autobiographical film in his Polish sextet, Success Is the Best Revenge. In the film, Michael York plays an exiled Polish director based on Skolimowski, whose real family played the wife and sons of the character. However, the film's financiers chose not to distribute the film so they could write it off on their taxes, bankrupting Skolimowski and causing him to relocate to Los Angeles.

=== American cinema ===
Skolimowski's Hollywood career seemed to begin strongly when Robert Duvall and Klaus Maria Brandauer chose to star in his first American film, The Lightship, and the film won the Special Jury Prize at the 42nd Venice International Film Festival. However, the film's production company, CBS Theatrical Films, went out of business, which negatively impacted its distribution and The Lightship would prove to be their final film. Skolimowski also gave villainous supporting turns in White Nights and Big Shots. He wrote and directed two more literary adaptations; Torrents of Spring, adapted from the novel by Ivan Turgenev, and 30 Door Key, adapted from Ferdydurke by Witold Gombrowicz. Neither film was well-received, and Skolimowski came to regard it as a mistake to adapt Gombrowicz's "untranslatable" Polish novel into an English-language "Euro-pudding", so he chose to retire from directing films.

In the following decades, Skolimowski occasionally continued to act. He played supporting roles in Mars Attacks!, L.A. Without a Map, Before Night Falls, The Day of the Siege: September Eleven 1683, and The Stolen Caravaggio. He received critical acclaim in 2007 for playing Uncle Stepan, a Russian expatriate, in David Cronenberg's Eastern Promises. In 2012, he appeared in The Avengers, as a villain interrogating Black Widow.

=== Later career ===
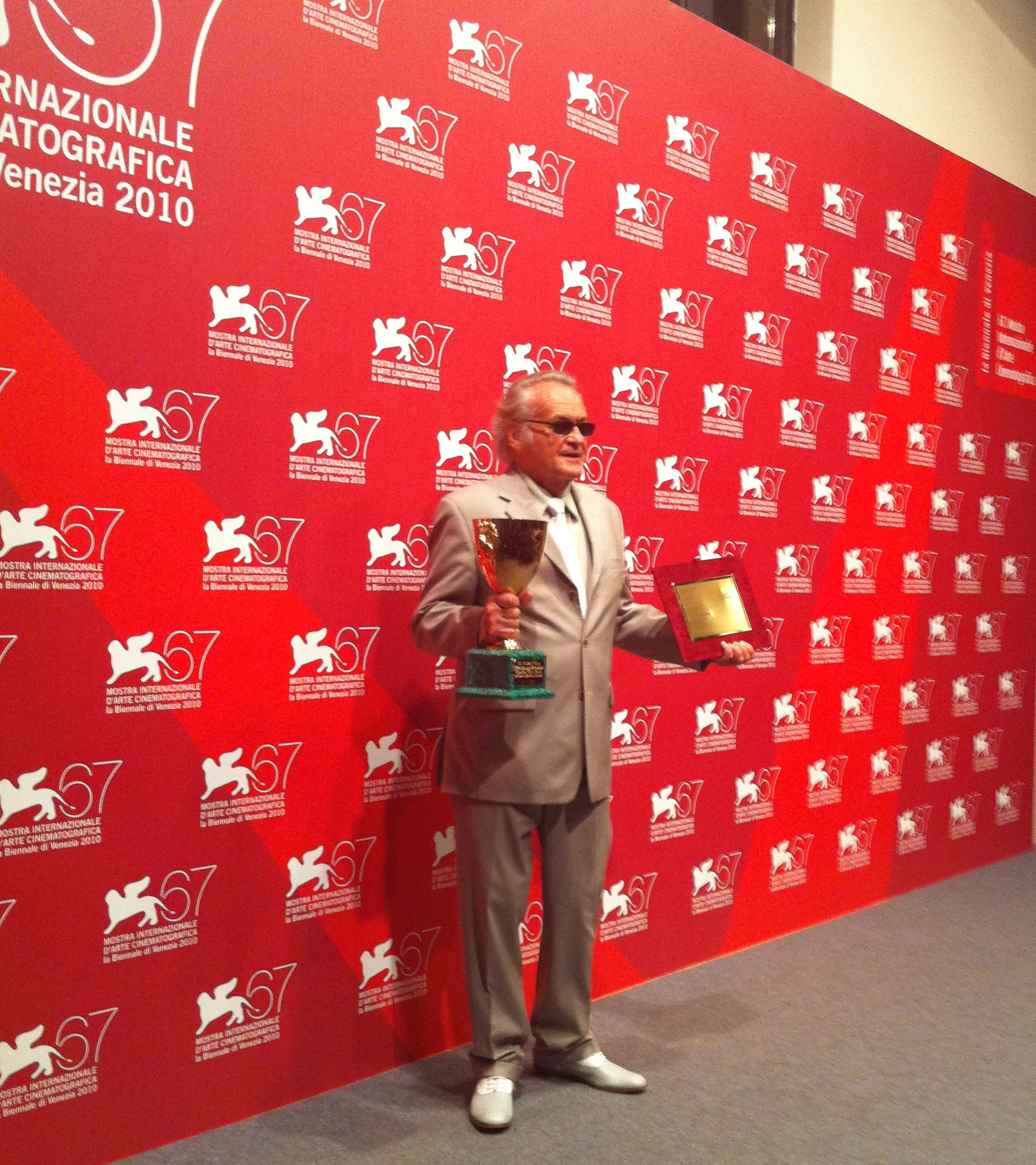
Skolimowski at the 2010 Venice Film Festival

In 2008, he directed his first film after his return from the US Cztery noce z Anną ("Four Nights with Anna").

In 2010, he directed Essential Killing starring Vincent Gallo and Emmanuelle Seigner. The film won multiple awards including Special Jury Prize at the 67th Venice International Film Festival, Golden Ástor Award at the Mar del Plata International Film Festival and the Golden Lions Award for Best Film at the Gdynia Film Festival. In 2011, he became the recipient of the Commander's Cross of the Order of Polonia Restituta and the French Ordre des Arts et des Lettres.

In 2015, he directed thriller film 11 Minutes starring Richard Dormer and Andrzej Chyra. It was selected as the Polish entry for the Best Foreign Language Oscar at the 88th Academy Awards.

In July 2016, at the Venice International Film Festival, Skolimowski was honoured with the Golden Lion for "lifetime achievement".

His film EO premiered at the 2022 Cannes Film Festival where it won the Jury Prize. The Polish-Italian co-production is a contemporary interpretation of the 1966 drama film Au hasard Balthazar directed by Robert Bresson. Submitted by Poland, EO was nominated for the Academy Award for Best International Feature Film at the 95th Academy Awards. In 2022, he co-wrote Roman Polański's drama film The Palace.

== Filmography ==
Year	Original title	English title	Director	Writer	Producer	Actor	Notes
1960	Hamles	Little Hamlet	Yes	Yes	No	No	
1960	Oko wykol	The Menacing Eye	Yes	Yes	No	No	
1960	Erotyk	Erotique	Yes	Yes	No	No	
1960	Niewinni czarodzieje	Innocent Sorcerers	No	Yes	No	Yes	
1961	Boks	Boxing	Yes	Yes	No	No	
1961	Pieniądze albo życie	Your Money or Your Life	Yes	Yes	No	No	
1961	Rzeźba		Yes	Yes	No	No	
1962	Nóż w wodzie	Knife in the Water	No	Yes	No	No	
1962	Druga taryfa		Yes	Yes	Yes	No	
1962	Akt	The Nude	Yes	Yes	No	No	
1965	Rysopis	Identification Marks: None	Yes	Yes	No	Yes	Also editor and art director
1965	Walkower	Walkover	Yes	Yes	No	Yes	Also editor
1966	Sposób bycia		No	No	No	Yes	
1966	Bariera	Barrier	Yes	Yes	No	No	
1967	Le départ	The Departure	Yes	Yes	No	No	
1968	Dialóg 20-40-60		Yes	Yes	No	No	Anthology film; segment: "The Twenty-Year-Olds"
1970	The Adventures of Gerard		Yes	Yes	No	No	
1970	Deep End		Yes	Yes	No	Yes	
1972	King, Queen, Knave		Yes	Yes	No	Yes	
1972	Poślizg		No	Yes	No	Yes	
1978	The Shout		Yes	Yes	No	No	
1981	Ręce do góry	Hands Up!	Yes	Yes	No	Yes	Filmed in 1967; also art director
1981	Die Fälschung	Circle of Deceit	No	No	No	Yes	
1982	Moonlighting		Yes	Yes	Yes	Yes	
1984	Success Is the Best Revenge		Yes	Yes	Yes	No	
1985	The Lightship		Yes	No	No	No	
1985	White Nights		No	No	No	Yes	
1987	Big Shots		No	No	No	Yes	
1989	Torrents of Spring		Yes	Yes	No	Yes	
1991	Ferdydurke	30 Door Key	Yes	Yes	Yes	Yes	
1993	Motyw cienia	The Hollow Men	No	No	Yes	No	
1996	Mars Attacks!		No	No	No	Yes	
1998	L.A. Without a Map		No	No	No	Yes	
2000	Before Night Falls		No	No	No	Yes	
2007	Eastern Promises		No	No	No	Yes	
2008	Cztery noce z Anna	Four Nights with Anna	Yes	Yes	Yes	No	
2010	Essential Killing		Yes	Yes	Yes	No	
2012	The Avengers		No	No	No	Yes	
2012	Bitwa pod Wiedniem	The Day of the Siege: September Eleven 1683	No	No	No	Yes	
2015	11 Minut	11 Minutes	Yes	Yes	Yes	No	
2018	Una storia senza nome	The Stolen Caravaggio	No	No	No	Yes	
2018	Juliusz		No	No	No	Yes	
2022	IO	EO	Yes	Yes	Yes	No	
2023	The Palace		No	Yes	No	No	
2023	Warszawianka		No	No	No	Yes	7 episodes

== Awards ==
Year	Award	Category
1964	PWSFTviT	Best Director (Identification Marks: None)
1965	Arnhem Film Festival	Grand Prix: Best Director (Identification Marks: None and Walkover)
1965	PWSFTviT	Andrzej Munk Award (Walkover)
1965	Bergamo Film Festival	Grand Prix (Barrier)
1967	Berlin Film Festival	Golden Bear (Le départ)
1967	Berlin Film Festival	Critics' Prize (UNICRIT Award) (Le départ)
1968	Valladolid International Film Festival	Special Jury Prize (Barrier)
1978	Cannes Film Festival	Special Jury Prize (The Shout)
1981	Polish Film Festival	Journalists Award (Hands Up!)
1982	Deutscher Filmpreis	Best Supporting Actor (Circle of Deceit)
1982	Cannes Film Festival	Best Screenplay (Moonlighting)
1985	Venice Film Festival	Special Jury Prize (The Lightship)
2008	Tokyo Film Festival	Special Jury Prize (Four Nights with Anna)
2009	International Istanbul Film Festival	Lifetime Achievement Award
2009	Lato Filmów: Warsaw Film and Art Festival	Best screenplay in the history of Polish cinema (Knife in the Water)
2009	Polish Film Awards	Eagle: Best Director (Four Nights with Anna)
2010	Venice Film Festival	Special Jury Prize (Essential Killing)
2010	Venice Film Festival	CinemAvvenire Award: Best Film In Competition (Essential Killing)
2010	Mar del Plata Film Festival	Golden Astor: Best Film (Essential Killing)
2010	Mar del Plata Film Festival	ACCA Award: Best Film in the International Competition (Essential Killing)
2010	Camerimage	Lifetime Achievement Award
2010	Polish Film Awards	Eagle: Best Director (Essential Killing)
2010	Polish Film Awards	Eagle: Best Film (Essential Killing)
2011	Polish Film Awards	Best Director (Essential Killing)
2011	Polish Film Awards	Golden Lions: Best Film (Essential Killing)
2011	Sopot Film Festival	Grand Prix (Essential Killing)
2012	Belgian Film Critics Association	Grand Prix (Essential Killing)
2015	Motovun Film Festival	Maverick Award for Lifetime Achievement
2016	Venice Film Festival	Golden Lion for Lifetime Achievement
2022	Cannes Film Festival	Jury Prize (EO)
2022	Valladolid International Film Festival	Best Director (EO)
2022	Los Angeles Film Critics Association	Best Foreign Language Film (EO)
2022	New York Film Critics Circle	Best Foreign Language Film (EO)
2022	Polish Film Awards	Eagle: Lifetime Achievement Award
2023	Polish Film Awards	Eagle: Best Film (EO)
2023	Polish Film Awards	Eagle: Best Director (EO)
2023	National Society of Film Critics	Best Foreign Language Film (EO)

== See also ==
- Polish cinema
- List of Poles
