= Essential Killing =

2010 Polish survival/political thriller film by Jerzy Skolimowski

- Polish theatrical release poster
- Directed by: Jerzy Skolimowski
- Written by: Jerzy Skolimowski; Ewa Piaskowska; James McManus
- Produced by: Jeremy Thomas; Ewa Piaskowska; Jerzy Skolimowski
- Starring: Vincent Gallo; Emmanuelle Seigner
- Cinematography: Adam Sikora
- Edited by: Maciej Pawliński
- Music by: Paweł Mykietyn
- Production companies: Skopia Film; Cylinder Production; Element Pictures; Mythberg Films; Canal+ Poland; Syrena Films; Akson Studio; Polski Instytut Sztuki Filmowej (as The Polish Film Institute); Bórd Scannán na hÉireann (The Irish Film Board); Norsk Filminstitutt (as The Norwegian Film Institute); Magyar Mozgókép Kozalapítvány (as Motion Picture Public Foundation of Hungary); Eurimages
- Distributed by: Syrena Films (2010, Poland)
- Release date: 6 September 2010 (Venice)
- Running time: 83 minutes
- Countries: Poland; Norway; Ireland; Hungary
- Languages: English; Polish; Arabic
- Box office: $490,320

Essential Killing is a 2010 survival political thriller film co-written and directed by Jerzy Skolimowski and starring Vincent Gallo and Emmanuelle Seigner. Gallo stars as an Islamic insurgent who finds himself fighting for survival in a frozen woodland, pursued by soldiers.

The film received generally positive reviews from critics, with many praising Gallo's performance. The film won several accolades, including the Special Jury Prize at the 67th Venice International Film Festival, while Gallo also won the Volpi Cup for Best Actor.

== Plot ==
An Arab is captured in the desert after attacking U.S. soldiers in Afghanistan, and then tortured and brutalized in a secret detention center. He finds himself transported to Poland, along with other prisoners. He manages to escape into the vast frozen woodland, a world away from the home he knew. In order to survive, he kills some of those who stray into his path and forages for food both from nature and from those he encounters. A woman gives him shelter, treats his wounds and feeds him before sending him back out into the wilderness. He departs on a white horse and, as the first shoots of spring are seen through the snow, appears to die.

== Cast ==
- Vincent Gallo as Mohammed
- Emmanuelle Seigner as Margaret
- Zach Cohen as American Contractor 1
- Iftach Ophir as American Contractor 2
- Nicolai Cleve Broch as Helicopter Pilot 1
- Stig Frode Henriksen as Helicopter Pilot 2
- David Price as Interrogating Officer
- Tracy Spencer Shipp as Young Soldier in SUV
- Mark Gaspersich as Head of Pursuit Team
- Phil Goss as Military Doctor

== Production ==
Essential Killing was shot in Israel, Poland, and Norway from December 2009 through to February 2010. The film saw Jerzy Skolimowski reunite with Jeremy Thomas, who produced his feature The Shout in 1978, which went on to win the Grand Prix du Jury at the Cannes Film Festival.

Skolimowski had been searching to replicate the conditions of his previous film, Four Nights with Anna, most of which was filmed near his home in the Polish Masurian forests. He had heard of rumored (and later revealed) CIA use of the nearby Szymany Airfield for flights carrying prisoners from the Middle East. Subsequently, Skolimowski skidded off the road during winter while driving a four-wheel drive vehicle. Noticing he was two kilometers from Szymany, it occurred to him that the same could easily happen to a prisoner transport and, from this, he found the initial inspiration for the Essential Killing scenario.

He shared a draft script with Jeremy Thomas who encouraged him to think beyond the modest local production Skolimowski had initially envisioned and the project grew, with Thomas as an executive producer, into a multi-national coproduction made under challenging circumstances: "In general, the working conditions were very difficult. Most of the movie was filmed at −35° in the high mountains, where you can not get even with a Snowcat. We had to practically climb to the set: the entire crew has suffered much about the situation, it was certainly the most difficult film I ever did. Vincent Gallo has had the most thankless task of all, having to run barefoot in the snow at those temperatures."

Aware of the potential political overtones of the film, Skolimowski initially nearly dismissed the project as being "too political", he strove to make it non-political: "The political aspects of the situation didn't interest me: to me politics is a dirty game and I don't want to voice my opinions. What is important is that the man who runs away is returning to the state of a wild animal, who has to kill in order to survive."

The film is deliberately non-specific as to locations: "I don't even say whether the film starts in Afghanistan, Iraq or maybe some other place, whether it's an American military base, where the prisoners are kept, whether it's situated in any of those countries. I don't say whether the plane which is landing somewhere in Europe is really landing in Szymany, in Poland."

As was also true with his protagonist's identity: "There is something in the facial features of Vincent Gallo that is difficult to identify. Nobody knows where he is from. I was hoping that even if Vincent would not be perceived as a native Arab or a Muslim, he would still be the 'different' one, not someone from here, not someone from there. Besides, it could be someone like John Walker Lindh, the famous Californian who became a Taliban member and joined Osama bin Laden's forces."

This enigmatic quality is furthered by the fact that the protagonist does not utter a single word during the course of the movie. Moreover, while some characters are named in the credits, no names are used in the film itself.

== Reception ==
The film received generally positive reviews from critics. On review aggregator Rotten Tomatoes, the film holds a 77% from 52 reviews, with an average rating of 6.2 out of 10. The site's critic consensus reads, "Driven by a uniquely stark mood and propulsive direction, Essential Killing excels due to an unrelentingly visceral performance from Vincent Gallo."

Film critic Roger Ebert gave the film 3/4 stars, praising Skolimowski's storytelling, as well as Gallo's lead performance.

== Festivals and awards ==
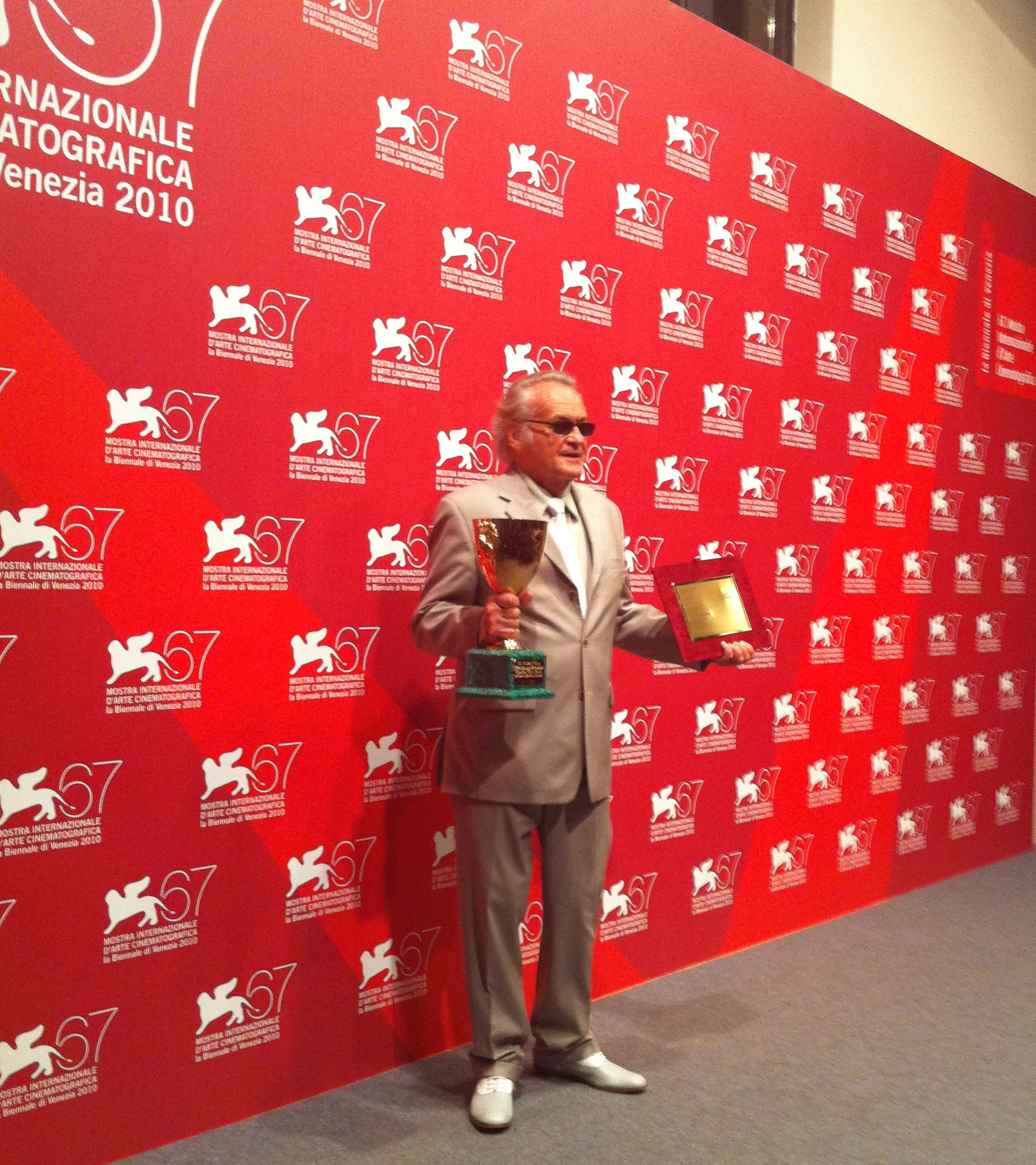
Director Skolimowski with Essential Killing's prizes at the 67th Venice International Film Festival

Essential Killing received its world premiere In Competition on September 6, 2010 at the 67th Venice International Film Festival. At the closing ceremony on 11 September 2010, the film won the Special Jury Prize, and Best Actor (the Volpi Cup), for Vincent Gallo's wordless performance as a Muslim insurgent, in addition to the CinemAvvenire Award for Best Film In Competition (voted by a non-statutory youth jury). Gallo was not present to receive his award, which was accepted on his behalf by Skolimowski, who urged the actor to come out of hiding in the audience and take the stage. It was the first time in the Festival's history that two major awards had been bestowed on a single film. At a press conference, Jury President Quentin Tarantino revealed that he had asked Festival head Marco Mueller to break the rules in order to honor the film, a change that will carry on into future editions of the Festival.

The film went on to win the Golden Astor for Best Film and Best Actor, and the Argentine Film Critics Association Critic's Prize at the Mar del Plata International Film Festival in Argentina (Latin America's most relevant competitive festival) and to screen in Official Selection at the Toronto International Film Festival, Festival do Rio, Tokyo International Film Festival, London International Film Festival and was selected as the closing film of both the Seville Festival of European Cinema and the 22nd edition of the Polish Film Festival in America in 2010. The film took the top prizes at the 2010 Polish Film Awards in Warsaw and swept the top awards at the 2011 Polish Film Festival in Gdynia. It was also nominated for the Grand Prix of the Belgian Film Critics Association.

Wins

- 67th Venice International Film Festival
  - Special Jury Prize
  - Coppa Volpi for the Best Actor: Vincent Gallo
  - CinemAvvenire Award: Best Film In Competition
- 25th Mar del Plata Film Festival
  - Golden Astor for Best Film
  - Silver Astor for Best Actor: Vincent Gallo
  - ACCA Award (Argentine Film Reviewers Association): Best Film in the International Competition
- 13th Polish Film Awards
  - Eagle for Best Film
  - Eagle for Best Director: Jerzy Skolimowski
  - Eagle for Best Music: Paweł Mykietyn
  - Eagle for Best Editing: Réka Lemhényi/Maciej Pawliński
- 36th Polish Film Festival
  - Golden Lion for Best Film
  - Best Director: Jerzy Skolimowski
  - Best Cinematography: Adam Sikora
  - Best Music: Paweł Mykietyn
  - Best Editing: Réka Lemhényi/Maciej Pawliński
- 11th Sopot Film Festival
  - Grand Prix

== See also ==
- The One That Got Away (1957)
- 49th Parallel (1941)
