= Walkover (film) =

1965 film written and directed by Jerzy Skolimowski

- Theatrical release poster
- Directed by: Jerzy Skolimowski
- Written by: Jerzy Skolimowski
- Starring: Aleksandra Zawieruszanka; Jerzy Skolimowski
- Cinematography: Antoni Nurzyński
- Edited by: Alina Faflik
- Music by: Andrzej Trzaskowski
- Release date: 1965
- Running time: 70 minutes
- Country: Poland
- Language: Polish

Walkover (Polish: Walkower) is a 1965 Polish drama film directed by Jerzy Skolimowski.

== Plot ==
This second feature film directed by Skolimowski continues the story of his alter ego, Andrzej Leszczyc, from Rysopis.

Young Andrzej Leszczyc, a dropout from engineering school, comes to a small city where he meets a former classmate, Teresa Karczewska, now a manager at the energy plant. She gets him a job at the factory, but Leszczyc is also a veteran boxer and has come to participate in a local amateur boxing tournament.

== Cast ==
- Aleksandra Zawieruszanka as Teresa Karczewska
- Jerzy Skolimowski as Andrzej Leszczyc
- Krzysztof Chamiec as factory chief
- Elżbieta Czyżewska as girl on the station
- Andrzej Herder as Marian Pawlak
- Stanisław Marian Kamiński
- Andrzej Jurczak
- Franciszek Pieczka

== Reception ==
Jean-Luc Godard, in the essays collected in Godard on Godard, wrote that this was one of the three films that he'd most want to write about if he were still a working film critic, praising Skolimowski for shifting between the "particular" and the "general", because the director "describes the individual and the environment at the same time, and probably does it better than anybody else.” Richard Brody of The New Yorker wrote that the film is "one of the masterworks of the brash, youthful, and defiant cinematic modernism of the mid-sixties, a film of a Polish New Wave that shares the insolence, the rejection of authority, and the energies of revolt that also mark the French New Wave."
