= Walek Dzedzej =

Polish musician and poet

Cyril Danicki ([SIH-ril dah-NEETZ-kee], pseudonym Walek Dzedzej [VAH-lek DZEH-dzey]) (December 13, 1953 – October 7, 2006) was a Polish songwriter, poet and musician, renowned as his country's first punk rock performer.

== Early years ==
Walek Dzedzej was born Lesław Danicki in Warsaw. In later interviews, he expressed admiration for the music and poetry of Bob Dylan and spoke of his ambition to be known as the "Polish Dylan". The spirit of the age, however, was to take him in another musical direction.

Political turmoil in the United States during the Vietnam War years of 1965-73 caused tremendous social, intellectual and cultural upheaval which reverberated with particular intensity throughout most of the countries of the Western Hemisphere, including Poland. The impact of the counterculture and the musical influence of the Woodstock generation had an immeasurable effect upon an entire generation of young Poles growing up under the restricting yoke of Communism.

Like many high school and college students who increasingly copied American and Western European hippie dress and music, the teenage Lesław ("Leszek" [LEH-shek]) Danicki was caught up in the flow of events. The movement for change brought a harsh counter-reaction, as the Communist authorities instituted a clampdown on the resulting strikes and demonstrations.

== Underground performer ==
By the time Leszek reached his early twenties, he was already known as "the bard of the underground passages" singing, to the accompaniment of an acoustic guitar, his Dylan-like protest songs in places where the secret police would be less likely to spot him—impromptu clubs and the numerous pedestrian passageways and underpasses beneath the sidewalks of Warsaw. To protect his family and his own anonymity as a songwriter, he adopted the literary pen name of Walek Dzedzej.

Between 1973 and 1977 Walek Dzedzej created a large number of texts, many of which are now lost, but the surviving ones, such as "Na ulicy nowy świat" ("On the New World Street"), "Nie mam nic do powiedzenia" ("I Have Nothing to Say") and "Dom wschodzącego słońca" (his version of "The House of the Rising Sun") have continued to be a part of the repertoire of numerous musical groups performing in Poland during the first decade of the 21st century. In 1977 director Andrzej Kostenko used his performances as background for his filmed-in-the-streets-of-Warsaw movie Sam na sam (Alone by Myself).

== Poland's first punk rock band ==
It was also in 1977 that Walek Dzedzej, along with percussionist Maciej Góralski pl:Maciej Góralski and bassist Jacek Kufirski formed what Polish music historians acknowledge as the country's first punk rock group, "Walek Dzedzej Pank Bend" (Punk Band). The group gave a number of impromptu performances, but only two official concerts, both at the Warsaw club "Hybrydy". There were privately made recordings of these performances, but none have been made available and their continued existence over the intervening years has remained strongly in doubt. However, the lyrics and orchestration of a number of the group's texts are, like Walek Dzedzej's earlier protest songs, widely known and disseminated among aficionados of classic punk rock.

As word of the concerts spread, all attempts at further performances were blocked by police censorship. Nearly two decades later, the prohibition was the inspiration for a tribute to their progenitors by the 1990s group "Zielone Żabki" ("Green Froggies"). Their song "Ostatni numer" ("Final Number") has become one of the emblematic texts of the Polish punk rock scene.

== The years abroad ==
Unable to cope with continued harassment by the authorities, Walek Dzedzej left Poland at the end of 1978 and performed in the streets and clubs of London, Paris, Barcelona, Berlin and finally Vienna, where he remained for five months and appeared on a national TV program devoted to punk rock.

In the spring of 1980 he received permission to travel to the United States. Shortly after arriving, he decided to settle permanently in New York, a decision officially certified by the December 1981 declaration of Martial law in Poland. During the 1980s and 1990s, Walek Dzedzej could be seen on an almost daily basis in the streets and subways of Manhattan, as well as in Polish clubs, performing his original protest songs together with the familiar Solidarność (Solidarity) anthems. The venues for his performances were usually Times Square or Tompkins Square Park.

In November 1988 Lesław "Walek Dzedzej" Danicki became American citizen Cyril Danicki. The legal change of his given name to the more-pronounceable "Cyril" was suggested by his French companion Pascale Richez, the mother of his only child, daughter Solange (born 1986).

== Return to Poland ==
Still remembered in Poland as the renowned punk rocker Walek Dzedzej, Cyril Danicki traveled to the country of his birth for one final visit. In summer 1997 he appeared on the Warsaw-based Polsat TV rock nostalgia program Who Is Who, performing his near-iconic rebel anthem "Nie jestem tym czym ty" ("I Am Not What You Are"), directing the lyrics at those clinging to conventionality and outdated values. The lyrics have a timeless appeal and apply equally to the recently departed Communist system and its collaborators and adherents, as well as to the general numbing mindset of present-day conformity and lack of originality. Shortly after this appearance, Cyril Danicki returned to New York.

== Death in the United States and burial in Poland ==
In his final years Cyril Danicki had been suffering from diabetes and performed less and less frequently. At age 52, he was found dead in his room at the Downtown Brooklyn single-room-occupancy hotel, where he had been living since December 1998. His funeral service on October 14, 2006, in Greenpoint, a largely Polish section of Brooklyn, was attended by his last companion, Cecylia Rećko.

Cyril Danicki's sister, Barbara Danicka, an actress and filmmaker residing in New York, repatriated his remains for burial on October 21 in the Danicki family crypt in Szydłów [SHID-loov] pl:Szydłów (województwo świętokrzyskie) near Kielce. His aged parents attended the services along with his 20-year-old daughter and her mother.

The following day, a musical evening dedicated to the memory of Walek Dzedzej was held at the Warsaw club "No Mercy".
