= The Shout =

- Theatrical release poster
- Directed by: Jerzy Skolimowski
- Screenplay by: Jerzy Skolimowski; Michael Austin
- Story by: Robert Graves
- Produced by: Jeremy Thomas; Richard D. Zanuck; David Brown
- Starring: Alan Bates; John Hurt; Susannah York; Robert Stephens; Tim Curry
- Cinematography: Mike Molloy
- Edited by: Barrie Vince
- Music by: Tony Banks; Mike Rutherford
- Production companies: Recorded Picture Company; Zanuck/Brown Company
- Distributed by: Rank Film Distributors
- Release date: 16 June 1978
- Running time: 86 minutes
- Country: United Kingdom
- Language: English
- Budget: less than £500,000
- Box office: £176,800

The Shout is a 1978 British horror film directed by Jerzy Skolimowski, starring Alan Bates, Susannah York, and John Hurt. It was based on a short story by Robert Graves and adapted for the screen by Skolimowski and Michael Austin. The film was the first to be produced by Jeremy Thomas under his Recorded Picture Company banner.

== Plot ==
Crossley, a mysterious travelling man, invades the lives of a young couple, Rachel and Anthony Fielding. Anthony is a composer, who experiments with sound effects and various electronic sources in his secluded Devon studio. The couple provides hospitality to Crossley but his intentions are gradually revealed as more sinister. He claims he has learned from an Aboriginal shaman how to produce a "terror shout" that can kill anyone who hears it unprotected.

== Cast ==
- Alan Bates as Crossley
- Susannah York as Rachel Fielding
- John Hurt as Anthony Fielding
- Robert Stephens as Chief Medical Officer
- Tim Curry as Robert Graves
- Julian Hough as vicar
- Carol Drinkwater as wife
- Susan Wooldridge as Harriet
- Jim Broadbent as fielder in cowpat

== Production ==
=== Background ===
Producer Jeremy Thomas had initially wanted Nicolas Roeg to direct the film but Roeg was unavailable. Eventually Thomas hired Jerzy Skolimowski due to Skolimowski's fluency in English as well as having been impressed with his prior work on Deep End. Finance came in part from the Rank Organisation.

=== Filming ===
Interiors were shot at Pinewood Studios; the film's sets were designed by the art director Simon Holland. The North Devon coastline, specifically Saunton Sands and Braunton Burrows, was used for the bulk of the location shooting. The church of St Peter in Westleigh was used for the church scenes. The producer, Jeremy Thomas, later remembered his experience making the film,

Because I had a great director, and a quality piece of literature, I managed to get a wonderful cast such as John Hurt and Alan Bates. Skolimowski had a sense of shooting style then, this was the second director who[m] I had worked closely with, and it was fascinating watching Skolimowski work. He came from a Polish tradition, the Wajda Film School, he had a different background to other directors I had been working with in the cutting rooms or elsewhere. And it made the film much more creative to me. I saw it more as an artistic endeavour by him. The film went to Cannes and won the Grand Prix de Jury. We were incredibly lucky and the film was appreciated by the jury. It was a very small festival then, nothing like the Cannes Film Festival of today, it was a small event in a cinema of 800 people or so.

=== Music ===
The soundtrack was by Mike Rutherford and Tony Banks of the progressive rock band Genesis. The central theme "From the Undertow" features on Banks's 1979 album A Curious Feeling.

== Reception ==
The Monthly Film Bulletin wrote: "Let down, finally, only by the wild antics of the conclusion, which almost suggests that this is the intellectual's Exorcist, The Shout is an elegant mirror-box construction, with uniquely dovetailed performances from its starry cast."

Leslie Halliwell wrote "Curiously gripping but ultimately pointless fable, very well done to little purpose."

In The Radio Times Guide to Films Adrian Turner gave the film 3/5 stars, writing: "Robert Graves's weird story becomes a weird movie, directed by Polish émigré Jerzy Skolimowski and starring Alan Bates as the mysterious interloper who claims to have murdered his family in Australia and is the custodian of various aboriginal curses. Chief of these is the ability to shout so loudly that it can kill. John Hurt and Susannah York are among those reaching for their earplugs."

Adam Scovell wrote for the BFI: "Polish director Jerzy Skolimowski brought a unique, outsider’s eye to the portrayal of Britain on film. He brilliantly faked much of London in Deep End (1970) while characterising the same city as an incredibly paranoid, almost dystopian zone in Moonlighting (1982). Most effective of all, however, is the director’s strange and darkly magical portrayal of the English coastline in his 1978 film The Shout, which contains – among many other unique things – one of British cinema’s most unnerving examples of sound design."

Michael Brooke wrote in Sight and Sound: "Skolimowski turns outwardly familiar English coastal landscapes into something deeply troubling, without ever resorting to stock horror film tropes. Instead, he finds naggingly unsettling details in unexpected crannies – a chicken trophy that's half stuffed, half skeletal, mounted above a selection of Francis Bacon prints in the studio of Anthony Fielding (John Hurt), a composer of electronic music who achieves his 'natural' effects by trapping bees in glass jars sealed by a microphone. And he's not even the strange one."

William Johnson wrote in Film Quarterly: "The maker of a film like The Shout has somehow to organize all the multifarious interactions of image, sound and content that baffle conscious preprogramming. Whatever the resource behind that "somehow," Skolimowski has at last tapped it."

On the review aggregator website Rotten Tomatoes, 86% of 14 critics' reviews are positive. On Metacritic, the film has a weighted average score of 67 out of 100 based on 8 critics, which the site labels as "generally favorable" reviews.

== Accolades ==
The film was nominated for the Palme d'Or at the 1978 Cannes Film Festival and received the Grand Prize of the Jury, in a tie with Bye Bye Monkey.

== Home media ==
The Shout was released on DVD in 2007 by Network.

It will be released by the Criterion Collection in October of 2026.
