= Barrier (film) =

1966 film by Jerzy Skolimowski

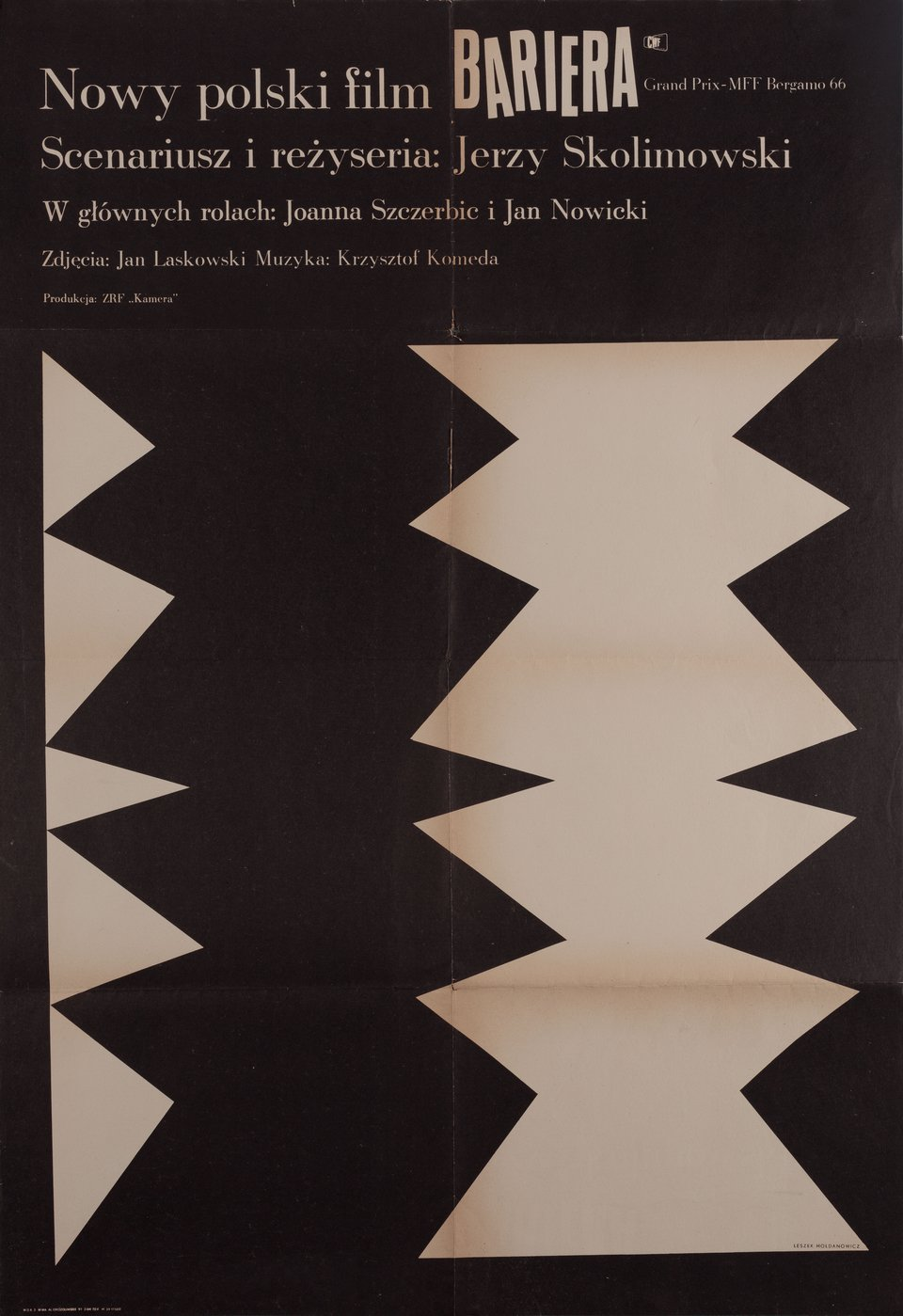
- Theatrical release poster
- Polish: Bariera
- Directed by: Jerzy Skolimowski
- Written by: Jerzy Skolimowski
- Starring: Jan Nowicki
- Cinematography: Jan Laskowski
- Edited by: Halina Prugar-Ketling
- Music by: Krzysztof Komeda
- Release date: 18 November 1966
- Running time: 77 minutes
- Country: Poland
- Language: Polish

Barrier (Polish: Bariera) is a Polish drama film directed by Jerzy Skolimowski, released in 1966. The hero quits his studies, resolving to seek social advancement by any means. A new girlfriend changes his mind.

== Details ==
- Title : Barrier
- Original title: Bariera
- Director: Jerzy Skolimowski
- Writer: Jerzy Skolimowski
- Country of origin: Poland
- Format : Black and white- Mono – 35 mm
- Genre : Drama
- Length: 77 minutes
- Release date: 1966

== Cast ==
- Joanna Szczerbic : Tram conductor
- Jan Nowicki : Protagonist
- Tadeusz Łomnicki : Doctor
- Maria Malicka : Businesswoman
- Zdzisław Maklakiewicz : Paper seller
- Ryszard Pietruski : Oberwaiter
- Bogdan Baer : Man at bar
- Henryk Bąk : Doctor
- Stefan Friedmann : Tram conductor asking for help
- Andrzej Herder : Manius
- Malgorzata Lorentowicz : Owner of the apartment
- Zygmunt Malanowicz : Eddy
- Janusz Gajos : Streetcar
- Marian Kociniak : Streetcar
