= Success Is the Best Revenge =

1984 film

- French theatrical release poster
- Directed by: Jerzy Skolimowski
- Written by: Jerzy Skolimowski; Michael Lyndon; Michel Ciment; Harriet Pacaud; Barbara Elster
- Produced by: Jerzy Skolimowski
- Starring: Michael York
- Cinematography: Mike Fash
- Edited by: Barrie Vince
- Music by: Stanley Myers; Hans Zimmer
- Distributed by: Gaumont Distribution (France); British Film Institute (United Kingdom)
- Release date: 23 May 1984
- Running time: 91 minutes
- Countries: France; United Kingdom
- Language: English
- Budget: £983,000

Success Is the Best Revenge (French: Le succès à tout prix) is a 1984 drama film directed by Jerzy Skolimowski and starring Michael York. It was entered into the 1984 Cannes Film Festival.

== Cast ==
- Michael York as Alex Rodak
- Joanna Szczerbic as Alicia Rodak
- Michael Lyndon as Adam Rodak
- Jerry Skol as Tony Rodak
- Michel Piccoli as French Official
- Anouk Aimée as Monique des Fontaines
- John Hurt as Dino Montecurva
- Ric Young as Chinese Waiter
- Claude Le Saché as Monsieur Conio
- Malcolm Sinclair as Assistant Stage Manager
- Hilary Drake as Stage Manager
- Jane Asher as Bank Manager

== Production ==
Success Is the Best Revenge was filmed in London. As the film's producer, Skolimowski decided to mortgage his house (which featured in several scenes) in order to raise funds for the project; when it failed to recoup the investment costs at the box office, he declared himself bankrupt and was forced to sell his home, subsequently leaving Britain for the United States.

Although refraining from starring in the film himself (opting to cast Michael York as his alter ego Alex instead), Skolimowski chose to cast his wife Joanna Szczerbic as Alex's wife and his sons Michał and Jerzy (appearing pseudonymously as Michael Lyndon and Jerry Skol respectively) as Alex's sons Adam and Tony.
