= Seven Sins of Medicine =

Perspective on medical ethics

The Seven Sins of Medicine, by Richard Asher, are a perspective on medical ethics first published in The Lancet in 1949.

Considered as poor personal conduct by physicians (or more typically, medical students) The Seven Sins describes behavior that in itself might not be grounds for professional complaint or discipline but would be considered discourteous, especially in any situation outside of the pompous physician – sick patient scenario.

Still very relevant in medical study and practice, they are:

1. Obscurity: Asher endorses the use of clear communication and plain language whether writing or speaking. Obscurity may be used to cloak one's own ignorance, or due to an inability to communicate with those outside of the medical profession. "If you don't know, don't admit it. Instead, try to confuse your listeners." is not uncommon.
  Regardless of the intention, whether to misdirect from incompetence or to foster a feeling of superiority, the patient and those surrounding them are often left confused and uncertain.
2. Cruelty: This sin is perhaps one of the most common perpetrations committed by physicians and medical students. Whether it be the physical thoughtlessness of a half-dozen students palpating a painful tumor mass, or loudly taking (or presenting) a patient's history in a crowded room, one of the first things that is unlearnt by a medical professional is to treat the patient as they themselves would like to be treated.
3. Bad Manners: Often overlooked, rudeness or poor taste in humour is condoned within the hospital setting. At the end of the day, many physicians and students are simply rude to patients that do not suit them. Whether it is a snapping at an uncooperative patient or making a cruel joke about them after leaving the room, the impact of these "coping mechanisms" (as they are considered to be by many) must be taken into account.
4. Over-Specialisation: In a growing trend by the medical establishment, over-specialisation and under-generalisation is a growing problem in the wider medical community. Ignoring aspects of one's education in favor of more interesting aspects is a behaviour that is pathological and outright negligent in a student. Failure to diagnose or to treat a patient because "their signs and differential fall outside of my field, let's turf them to another service" ought be a seriously considered Supervisory & Training issue.
5. Love of the Rare: (aka "If you hear hoof-beats, think horses. Not zebras") The desire for rare and interesting diseases causes many medical students and young physicians to seek the bizarre rather than seeing a mundane diagnosis.
6. Common Stupidity: As well as the standard definition for this sin, the specific example of "using empirical procedures rather than tailoring for the patient" or the young physician "flying on autopilot" must be mentioned. Ordering another test that is redundant, and for which the results may already be interpreted from the history, before starting treatment is such a situation. For example: requesting a haemoglobin count before beginning transfusion, despite the fact that the patient appears obviously anaemic.
7. Sloth: Laziness. Also includes ordering excessive numbers of tests, rather than simply taking the time to take an adequate history.

For further information see Bruce Rowat's essay.
