= Jane Asher =

English actress and author (born 1946)

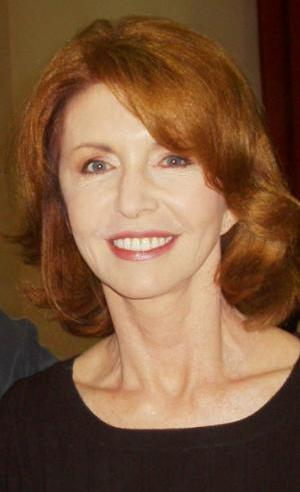
- Asher in 2008
- Born: 5 April 1946 (age 80); Willesden, Middlesex, England
- Occupations: Actress; author
- Years active: 1952–present
- Spouse: Gerald Scarfe (m. 1981)
- Partner: Paul McCartney (1963–1968)
- Children: 3
- Parents: Richard Asher (father); Margaret Eliot (mother)
- Relatives: Peter Asher (brother); Victoria Asher (niece)

Jane Asher (born 5 April 1946) is an English actress and author. She achieved early fame as a child actress. She has worked extensively in film and television.

Asher has appeared in television shows and films such as Deep End (1970), The Masque of the Red Death (1964), Alfie (1966), The Mistress, Crossroads, Death at a Funeral (2007), and The Old Guys. She also appeared in two episodes of the 1950s TV series The Buccaneers alongside Robert Shaw. She was Paul McCartney's girlfriend from 1963 to 1968.

Asher has been nominated for the BAFTA Award for Best Actress in a Supporting Role for the film Deep End and the British Academy Television Award for Best Actress for television performances in A Voyage Round My Father (1982) and Love Is Old, Love Is New (1982).

== Early life ==
Asher was born in London, the middle of three children born to Richard and Margaret Asher, née Eliot. Her father was a consultant in blood and mental diseases at the Central Middlesex Hospital, as well as being a broadcaster and the author of notable medical articles. Her mother was a professor at the Guildhall School of Music and Drama. Asher was educated at Miss Lambert's PNEU School for Girls at Paddington, North Bridge House School, and then at Queen's College in Harley Street, London. Asher's elder brother is record producer and manager Peter Asher, who began his career as Peter of Peter and Gordon.

== Acting career ==
=== Film, television and audio ===
Asher was a child actress who appeared in the 1952 film Mandy and the 1955 science fiction film The Quatermass Xperiment. She also played the title role in dramatised versions of Alice in Wonderland and Through the Looking-Glass in 1958 for Argo Records. In 1961 she co-starred in The Greengage Summer, which was released in the United States as Loss of Innocence. She also appeared in the 1962 film and Disney TV programme, The Prince and the Pauper. Her British TV appearances included three episodes (1956–1958) of the ITV series The Adventures of Robin Hood and as a panellist on the BBC's Juke Box Jury.

In July 1962, Asher appeared in an Out of This World episode called "Cold Equations", playing a teenage stowaway on a space ship. Its captain, played by Peter Wyngarde, is ordered to jettison her into space, and she pleads for her life, but has to come to terms with her imminent death. She then dies calmly.

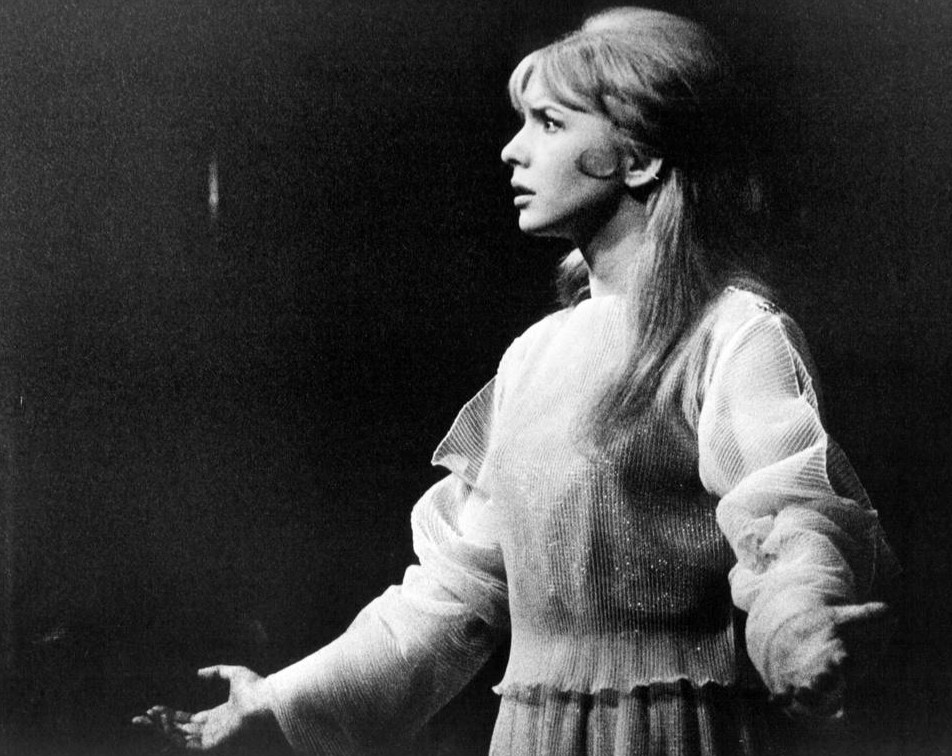
Asher as Juliet when the Bristol Old Vic made a US tour in 1967

Asher appeared in Roger Corman's The Masque of the Red Death (1964) with Vincent Price, in Alfie opposite Michael Caine in 1966, and in Jerzy Skolimowski's Deep End (1970) with John Moulder Brown.

Having played Alice herself as an 11-year-old child in the audio recordings of Alice in Wonderland and Through the Looking Glass in 1958, Asher played the real Alice's (Alice Liddell) mother, Lorina Liddell, in the 1985 Dennis Potter film Dreamchild alongside Coral Browne (Alice Hargreaves), Ian Holm (Lewis Carroll/Charles Dodgson), Peter Gallagher, and Amelia Shankley (young Alice).

On television, she guest-starred in the play The Stone Tape and in episodes of Wicked Women, Rumpole of the Bailey and the British television comedy series The Goodies, as Celia Ryder in the 1981 Granada Television adaptation of Brideshead Revisited, and later in A Voyage Round My Father opposite Laurence Olivier, The Mistress (1985–87), and as Faith Ashley in Wish Me Luck (three seasons from 1987 to 1989).

In 1994, she portrayed the Doctor Who companion Susan Foreman in a BBC Radio 4 comedy drama Whatever Happened to Susan Foreman? Another notable radio broadcast was in The Further Adventures of Sherlock Holmes in 2002, in the episode "The Peculiar Persecution of Mr John Vincent Harden".

In 2003, she appeared in the revived ITV soap Crossroads in which she played the hotel's owner Angel Sampson. After the soap was axed, Asher apologised to Crossroads fans for the way the 2003 series went.

In 2006, Asher starred in the Richard Fell adaptation of the 1960s science fiction series A for Andromeda, which aired on the British digital television station BBC Four. In 2007, she portrayed the widow Sandra in the Frank Oz film Death at a Funeral. In the same year Asher appeared in the BBC medical drama Holby City as Lady Byrne. In October 2007, she played Andrea Yates in The Sarah Jane Adventures, in the episode "Whatever Happened to Sarah Jane?" Asher co-starred in the 2008 ITV drama series The Palace, filmed in Lithuania; she played Queen Charlotte, mother of King Richard IV.

In August 2008, Asher appeared with other showbusiness personalities in the reality TV talent show-themed television series Maestro, broadcast on BBC Two. From 2009 to 2010, she played Sally in the BBC One comedy series The Old Guys. In 2011, she played Margaret Harker in Waterloo Road.

=== Stage ===
In 2004, she starred in Festen at the Arts Theatre. In 2005, she starred in The World's Biggest Diamond, by Gregory Motton, at the Royal Court Theatre.

In October 2009, she appeared as Delia in Peter Hall's revival of Alan Ayckbourn's Bedroom Farce at the Rose Theatre, Kingston, and in her first pantomime, Snow White and the Seven Dwarfs at Richmond Theatre in December 2009, receiving enthusiastic reviews for both. In 2011, she returned to the Rose, Kingston as Lady Bracknell in The Importance of Being Earnest.

In 2012, she appeared in Charley's Aunt at the Menier Chocolate Factory. In the summer of 2013, she played Lady Catherine de Bourgh in Pride and Prejudice at the Open Air Theatre, Regent's Park. In 2014, she starred in the stage adaptation of Penelope Lively's Moon Tiger at the Theatre Royal Bath and on tour. In 2016, Asher took on the role of Miss Havisham in Michael Eaton's adaptation of Great Expectations. She took on the role of Madame Baurel in the 2017 London stage production of An American in Paris. In 2019 she toured in Noël Coward's A Song at Twilight.

In 2023 she played Lady Kitty in Somerset Maugham's The Circle, in a touring production directed by Tom Littler that opened at the Orange Tree Theatre, in Richmond, London. In 2026-27 she will tour as Queen Elizabeth II in the play By Royal Appointment by Daisy Goodwin.

== Other work ==
Asher has written three novels: The Longing, The Question, and Losing It, and published more than a dozen lifestyle, costuming, and cake decorating books. Asher owns a company that makes party cakes and sugar crafts for special occasions.

She is a shareholder in Private Eye, president of Arthritis Care, and a patron of Scoliosis Association (UK).

She is also president of the National Autistic Society. She was a speaker at the 2006 launch of the National Autistic Society's "Make School Make Sense" campaign and is president of Parkinson's UK. In March 2010, Asher became vice president to Autistica, a UK charity raising funds for autism research. Asher is also a patron of TRACKS Autism, an early years nursery setting for children on the autistic spectrum and The Daisy Garland, a national registered charity supporting children with drug resistant epilepsy.

== Personal life ==
Asher met Paul McCartney of The Beatles on 18 April 1963 at the Royal Albert Hall in London, and began a five-year relationship with him. In December 1963, McCartney took up residence at Asher's family Wimpole Street townhouse and stayed there until the couple moved into McCartney's own home in St John's Wood in 1966. McCartney wrote several Beatles songs inspired by Asher, including "And I Love Her", "For No One", "I'm Looking Through You", "Things We Said Today", "We Can Work It Out", "What You're Doing" and "You Won't See Me". The couple announced on Christmas Day 1967 that they were engaged to be married, and Asher accompanied the Beatles and their partners to Rishikesh, India in early 1968 to attend an advanced transcendental meditation training session with the Maharishi Mahesh Yogi. In mid-1968, she returned to London from an acting assignment in Bristol earlier than expected and allegedly discovered McCartney in bed with Francie Schwartz, an American artist. Shortly afterwards, her mother, Margaret Asher, drove to Cavendish Avenue to collect her daughter's belongings.

On 20 July 1968, Asher announced to the BBC that her engagement had been called off. McCartney soon after started dating Linda Eastman, whom he married in March 1969. Problems in the relationship had been McCartney's drug use and close relationship with John Lennon. Asher confided to Beatles' biographer Hunter Davies that McCartney had "changed so much. He was on LSD, which I hadn't shared. I was jealous of all the spiritual experiences he'd had with John. There were fifteen people dropping in all day long. The house had changed and was full of stuff I didn't know about." She was one of many people interviewed for Davies' The Beatles: The Authorised Biography, and the quotes used mark her last public comments regarding McCartney. Asher dislikes discussing her relationship with McCartney; saying in 2004: "I've been happily married for 30-something years. It's insulting." Interviewed again in 2026, Asher's position remained unchanged. "I decided years ago it would be a blank...People would offer me money to talk about it, all sorts of things. But I won’t discuss it. It was so long ago."

Asher attended the 1970 London premiere of the Beatles' movie Let It Be, along with Lennon's ex-wife Cynthia.

In 1971, Asher met illustrator Gerald Scarfe. They married in 1981 and have three children.

As part of a 2009 campaign by the Parkinson's Disease Society, Asher was one of a group of people, including Jeremy Paxman and John Stapleton, who pledged to donate their brains to Parkinson's research following their death.

== Filmography ==
=== Film ===
Year	Title	Role	Notes	Ref
1952	Mandy	Nina Roads		
1954	Dance Little Lady	First Child	Uncredited	
1954	Third Party Risk	Girl	Uncredited	
1954	Adventure in the Hopfields	McBain Child	Uncredited	
1955	The Quatermass Xperiment	Little Girl	Uncredited	
1956	Charley Moon	Benesta		
1961	The Greengage Summer	Hester Grey	Released as The Loss of Innocence in the U.S.	
1963	Girl in the Headlines	Lindy Birkett	Released as The Model Murder Case in the U.S.	
1964	The Masque of the Red Death	Francesca		
1966	Alfie	Annie		
1967	The Winter's Tale	Perdita		
1970	Deep End	Susan		
1970	The Buttercup Chain	Margaret		
1972	Henry VIII and His Six Wives	Jane Seymour		
1983	Runners	Helen		
1984	Success Is the Best Revenge	Bank Manager		
1985	Dreamchild	Mrs. Liddell		
1988	Paris by Night	Pauline		
1993	Closing Numbers	Anna		
2006	Tirant lo Blanc	Empress of Visaantia		
2007	Death at a Funeral	Sandra		
2013	I Give It a Year	Diana		
2015	Drunk on Love	Miss Sharp		
2015	Burn Burn Burn	Amelia		
2021	Splinter	Psychiatrist		
2024	A Family Affair	Margaret		

=== Television ===
Year	Title	Role	Notes	Ref
1956	The Adventures of Robin Hood	Alice	Episode: "The Children of Greenwood"	
1957	The Buccaneers	Jenny Purdy	Episode: "Flip and Jenny"	
1957	Sword of Freedom	Tristana	Episode: "The Marionettes"	
1958	The Adventures of Robin Hood	Susan	Episode: "The Christmas Goose"	
1958	Castle Dangerous	Jenny	TV film	
1958	Queen's Champion	Mary Brandon	2 episodes	
1960	The Four Just Men	Yvonne	Episode: "The Man in the Road"	
1961	ITV Television Playhouse	Verna Anderson	Episode: "The Summer's Pride"	
1961	The Renegade	Patricia Ratchett	TV film	
1961	Probation Officer	Patsy	Episode: #3.1	
1961	Home Tonight	Kathy	All 5 episodes	
1962	The Prince and the Pauper	Lady Jane Grey	3 episodes	
1962	Out of This World	Lee Cross	Episode: "Cold Equations"	
1962	Dixon of Dock Green	Joan Lane	Episode: "The High Price of Freedom"	
1962	Romeo and Juliet	Juliet	All episodes	
1962	Dr. Finlay's Casebook	Mattie Lennox	Episode: "Behind Closed Doors"	
1963	The Saint	Ellen Chase	Episode: "The Invisible Millionaire"	
1963	Jezebel ex UK	Helen	Episode: "The Four-Legged Stowaway"	
1963	24-Hour Call	Caroline Bullivant	Episode: "Love for Caroline"	
1964	The Saint	Rose Yearley	Episode: "The Noble Sportsman"	
1968	Journey to the Unknown	Marielle	Episode: "Somewhere in the Crowd"	
1972	The Stone Tape	Jill Greely	TV movie	
1972	Hedda Gabler	Thea Elvsted	TV movie	
1970	Wicked Women	Anne-Maria Moody	Episode: "Anne-Maria Moody"	
1973	Wessex Tales	Lucy Saville	Episode: "Fellow Townsmen"	
1977	The Goodies	Caroline Kook	Episode: "Punky Business"	
1978	Hawkmoor	Lady Johane Williams	5 episodes	
1978	Hazell	Georgina Gunning	Episode: "Hazell Plays Solomon"	
1978	Rumpole of the Bailey	Kathy Trelawny	Episode: "Rumpole and the Alternative Society"	
1981	Brideshead Revisited	Celia Ryder	2 episodes	
1982	East Lynne	Emma Vane	TV movie	
1984	A Voyage Round My Father	Elizabeth	TV movie	
1984	Tales of the Unexpected	Jane Oates	Episode: "The Last of the Midnight Gardeners"	
1985	The Mistress	Helen Carpenter	6 episodes	
1988	Wish Me Luck	Faith Ashley	22 episodes	
1990	French and Saunders	Herself	Episode: "Episode 7"	
1991	Murder Most Horrid	Lydia Howling	Episode: "The Girl from Ipanema"	
1993	French and Saunders	Herself	Episode: "In Bed with French and Saunders"	
2003	Crossroads	Angel Sampson	18 episodes	
2004	Agatha Christie's Marple	Mrs. Sylvia Lester	Episode: "Murder at the Vicarage"	
2005	New Tricks	Lady Deeley	Episode: "17 Years of Nothing"	
2006	A for Andromeda	Professor Madeleine Dawnay	TV movie	
2007	The Sarah Jane Adventures	Andrea Yates	2 episodes; Whatever Happened to Sarah Jane?	
2007–2010	Holby City	Lady Byrne	23 episodes	
2008	The Palace	Queen Charlotte	8 episodes	
2009–2010	The Old Guys	Sally	12 episodes	
2010	Agatha Christie's Poirot	Lady Mary	Episode: "Three Act Tragedy"	
2011	Waterloo Road	Margaret Harker	1 episode	
2013	Dancing on the Edge	Mrs. Luscombe	3 episodes	
2015	Pompidou	Posh Lady	1 episode	
2015	Stella	Hazel	3 episodes	
2015	Crossing Lines	Jane Clerkenwell	2 episodes	
2015	Tom and Jenny	Pauline	TV pilot	
2015–2016	Eve	Mary Douglas	13 episodes	
2016	The Life of Rock with Brian Pern	Cindy Batt	1 episode	
2017	The Gigolo	Christie	TV movie	
2023	The Wedding Veil Journey	Lady Dalton	TV movie	
2026	Shakespeare & Hathaway: Private Investigators	Mariana Florence	Episode: "By Love's Own Sweet Constraint"	
2026	Midsomer Murders	Theresa Bellrose	Episode: "Like and Subscribe"	
