= Richard Asher =

British endocrinologist (1912–1969)

Richard Asher FRCP
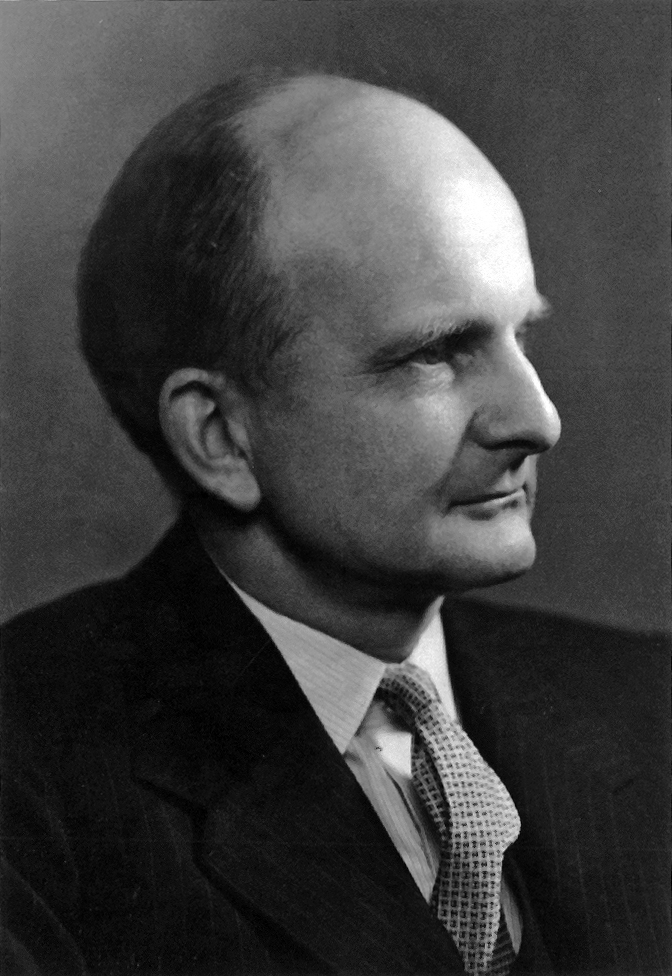
- Born: Richard Alan John Asher; 3 April 1912; Brighton, Sussex, England
- Died: 25 April 1969 (aged 57); London, England
- Occupation: Physician
- Spouse: Margaret Eliot (m. 1943)
- Children: 3, including Peter and Jane

Richard Alan John Asher (3 April 1912 – 25 April 1969) was a British endocrinologist and haematologist.

As the senior physician responsible for the mental observation ward at the Central Middlesex Hospital, he described and named Munchausen syndrome in a 1951 article in The Lancet.

== Personal life ==
Richard Asher was born to the Reverend Felix Asher and his wife Louise (née Stern). He married Margaret Augusta Eliot at St Pancras' Church, London, on 27 July 1943, whereupon his father-in-law gave him a complete set of the Oxford English Dictionary, which doctor and medical ethicist Maurice Pappworth alleged was the source of Asher's "accidental" reputation as a medical etymologist.

Richard Asher and his wife had three children: Peter Asher (born 1944), a member of the pop duo Peter & Gordon and later record producer; Jane Asher (born 1946), a film and TV actress and novelist; and Clare Asher (born 1948), a radio actress. Richard Asher's brother Thomas married Margaret's sister, Susan.

The Asher family home above his private consulting rooms at 57 Wimpole Street was briefly notable when Paul McCartney of The Beatles lived there in 1964–66, at the height of "Beatlemania", during his relationship with Jane Asher.

In 1964 Asher suddenly gave up his hospital post and perhaps all medical activities. He suffered from depression in later life and reportedly committed suicide at the age of 57. He died at 57 Wimpole Street, leaving a will and an estate valued at £35,937.

== Ideas and reputation ==
Asher was regarded as "one of the foremost medical thinkers of our times", who emphasised the need "to be increasingly critical of our own and other people's thinking". He was particularly concerned that "many clinical notions are accepted because they are comforting rather than because there is any evidence to support them".

Asher was hailed as a pioneer in challenging the value of excessive bed rest following treatment, and argued that the Pel–Ebstein fever (a fever characteristic for Hodgkin's disease) was an example of a condition that exists only because it has a name.

Asher's 1949 paper "Myxoedematous Madness" alerted a generation of physicians to the interaction between the brain and the thyroid gland. As a result, young and elderly psychiatric patients are now screened for thyroid malfunction. Some of the 'madness' cases are now thought to be the early descriptions of Hashimoto's encephalopathy, a rare neuroendocrine syndrome sometimes presenting with psychosis.

== Notable articles ==
Asher is remembered today mostly for his "refreshingly provoking" articles which "sparkle with sequins--his own aphorisms, imaginary dialogue, fantasies, quotations." He thought that medical writing should provide "useful, understandable, and practical knowledge instead of allotov-words-2-obscure-4-any-1,2-succidin-understanding-them." Anthologies of his articles were well-received, with the Talking Sense collection being described as "still the best advice on medical writing." Notable articles include:

- The Dangers of Going to Bed (1947) - "one of the most influential medical papers ever written"
- The Seven Sins of Medicine (1949, in The Lancet 1949 Aug 27;2(6574):358-60)
- Myxoedematous Madness (1949)
- Munchausen's syndrome (1951, in The Lancet 1951 Feb 10;1(6650):339-41)
- Straight and Crooked Thinking in Medicine (1954)
- Respectable Hypnosis (1956)
- Why Are Medical Journals So Dull? (1958)
- The Talking Sense trilogy:
  - Clinical Sense (1959) with a rueful correction in The Dog in the Night-time (1960)
  - Making Sense (1959, in The Lancet, 1959, 2, 359)
  - Talking Sense (1959, in The Lancet, 1959, 2, 417)

== "Seven Sins of Medicine" ==
The "Seven Sins of Medicine" is a lecture delivered by Asher and later published in The Lancet, describing medical professional behaviour that is considered inappropriate. These sins are often quoted to students:

1. Obscurity
2. Cruelty
3. Bad manners
4. Over-specialisation
5. Love of the rare
6. Common stupidity
7. Sloth

== Prize in Asher's memory ==
From 1995 to 2010, in memory of Asher, an annual prize (2010 value £1,200) was awarded by the Royal Society of Medicine and the Society of Authors for the best first-edition textbook aimed at undergraduate students. The most recent prize was presented at the Royal Society of Medicine, on 27 October 2010, to Hugo Farne, Edward Norris-Cervetto, and James Warbrick-Smith for their book Oxford Cases in Medicine and Surgery.

== See also ==
- Medical writing
