= Academy of Creative Training =

Coordinates: 50.8201°N 0.1308°W

Location
- Rock Place; Brighton, East Sussex, BN2 1PF; England

Information
- Type: Drama school
- Website: http://www.actbrighton.org

The Academy of Creative Training is an independent drama school in Brighton, East Sussex, England. ACT has two sites: one in Kemptown, Brighton and one in Hove.

== History ==
ACT was founded by actor John Moulder-Brown in 1997 along with a group of producers, directors, writers and agents. Classes are in the evenings and at weekends so that students can continue to meet their working and/or domestic commitments whilst training.

== Overview ==
The school awards a two-year diploma in Acting with a Trinity College London ATCL qualification and a one-year Foundation in Acting. The school also runs a range of short courses and workshops as well as a youth theatre and classes for children.
