= Simon Holland =

British production designer (1940–2010)

- Born: 27 September 1940; United Kingdom
- Died: 13 November 2010 (aged 70); United Kingdom, Dulverton
- Occupation: Production Designer
- Years active: 1969–2008 (film)

Simon Holland (27 September 1940 – 13 November 2010) was a British production designer.

== Selected filmography ==
- Bartleby (1970)
- Swallows and Amazons (1974)
- Rosebud (1975)
- Equus (1977)
- The Shout (1978)
- Agatha (1979)
- Reds (1981)
- The Emerald Forest (1985)
- The Believers (1987)
- Buster (1988)
- Scandal (1989)
- Nuns on the Run (1990)
- King Ralph (1991)
- Where Angels Fear to Tread (1991)
- Decadence (1994)
- Swept from the Sea (1997)
- Captain Jack (1999)
- The Sleeping Dictionary (2003)
- The Adventures of Greyfriars Bobby (2005)

== Bibliography ==
- Hoyle, Brian. The Cinema of John Boorman. Scarecrow Press, 2012.
- Fisher, Lucy. Art Direction and Production Design. Rutgers University Press, 2015.
