= Le Départ =

- Directed by: Jerzy Skolimowski
- Written by: Andrzej Kostenko; Jerzy Skolimowski
- Starring: Jean-Pierre Léaud; Catherine-Isabelle Duport
- Cinematography: Willy Kurant
- Music by: Krzysztof Komeda
- Release date: 1967
- Running time: 93 minutes
- Country: Belgium
- Language: French

Le Départ is a 1967 Belgian comedy film directed by Jerzy Skolimowski. It stars Jean-Pierre Léaud as a car-obsessed young man trying to get possession of a Porsche for a race. The film won the Golden Bear at the 17th Berlin International Film Festival. The film was also selected as the Belgian entry for the Best Foreign Language Film at the 40th Academy Awards, but was not accepted as a nominee.

In several English-speaking countries, it has been released under the title The Departure.

== Plot ==
Marc is a young hairdresser in Brussels who is crazy about cars. Hoping his boss will lend him his Porsche 911S, he has entered for a rally. However, his boss says he is using the car that weekend. After failing to con a dealer into a loan, he decides to sell everything he has. In the process he meets an attractive girl called Michèle, who supports his plan, and the two end up shut inside the Brussels Motor Show for the night.

His next idea is to approach a client of the salon, a rich older woman who has a Porsche, and try to charm it from her. Finding her at a catwalk show of bikinis, she takes him into her car and fellates him. Abandoning that line of attack, he learns that he cannot rent a car because he is too young and then he fails to steal one in the street. When telling Michèle that all avenues seem closed, his boss returns and says he can have the Porsche for the weekend after all.

At the hotel by the starting line, he finds they can only afford one room, so he disguises himself as a girl and goes up with Michèle. They talk late and fall asleep on the bed. In the morning, cars are revving up for the start but the two have overslept. Emerging from the bathroom, Marc pulls the bedding off Michèle to find that she is naked and waiting for him. The film ends at that moment, leaving viewers to assume that Marc is going to find a relationship with Michèle more rewarding than rallying.

== Cast ==
- Jean-Pierre Léaud - Marc
- Catherine-Isabelle Duport - Michèle (as Catherine Duport)
- Jacqueline Bir - The Woman
- Paul Roland - The Boss
- Leon Dony
- Lucien Charbonnier
- Georges Aubrey
- John Dobrynine
- Bernard Graczyk
- Marthe Dugard
- Maxane
- Jacques Courtois
- Paul Frère - Paul Frère
- Paul Delrivière

== See also ==
- List of submissions to the 40th Academy Awards for Best Foreign Language Film
- List of Belgian submissions for the Academy Award for Best Foreign Language Film
