= Andrzej Leszczyc =

Fictional character created and performed by Jerzy Skolimowski

Andrzej Leszczyc is a fictional character created and performed by Jerzy Skolimowski. He appears in three Skolimowski's early movies: Identification Marks: None (Rysopis, 1964), Walkover (Walkower, 1965) and Hands Up! (Ręce do góry, completed 1967, released 1981).

== Description ==
Andrzej Leszczyc is a young, about 26 years old, intelligent man, past ichthyology student. He is lost in his life. Iwona Grodź wrote in Skolimowski's biography that "uncertainty about Leszczyc's own plans denies his maturity. He doesn't know, what he wants to do in his life”.

Leszczyc sometimes has been described as Skolimowski's alter ego.

== Skolimowski about Leszczyc ==
Skolimowski said about the role: "Obviously, I didn't want to expose myself too much...Leszczyc is a good mixture of fiction and reality. But he isn't me. Only to a certain degree”. The director also said, that he was improvising a lot playing Leszczyc.
