= King, Queen, Knave (film) =

1972 film

- DVD cover
- Directed by: Jerzy Skolimowski
- Screenplay by: David Seltzer; David Shaw
- Story by: Vladimir Nabokov
- Produced by: Lutz Hengst; David L. Wolper
- Starring: Gina Lollobrigida; David Niven
- Cinematography: Charly Steinberger
- Edited by: Melvin Shapiro
- Music by: Stanley Myers
- Production companies: Bavaria Film; Maran Film; Wolper Productions
- Release date: 8 June 1972
- Running time: 94 minutes
- Countries: West Germany; United States
- Language: English

King, Queen, Knave is a 1972 West German comedy film directed by Jerzy Skolimowski, based on the novel of the same name by Vladimir Nabokov.

== Plot ==
Adopted by his rich Uncle Charles and taken to Germany on the death of his parents, the inept British teenager Frank is introduced to the free-wheeling 1970s European lifestyle and begins to fantasise about his uncle's glamorous Italian wife Martha. She seduces Frank and then tries to persuade him to kill her husband so that they can inherit his money. However, though the idea is to drown Charles from a rowing boat, they all fall into the water and she drowns by accident instead, leaving uncle and nephew to resume the friendly relations that she had disrupted.

== Cast ==
- Gina Lollobrigida as Martha Dreyer
- David Niven as Charles Dreyer
- John Moulder Brown as Frank
- Mario Adorf as Professor Ritter
- Carl Duering as Enricht
- Barbara Valentin as Optician
- Sonia Hofmann as Sonia
- Erica Beer as Frieda
- Elma Karlowa as Hanna
- Mogens von Gadow as Piffke
- Felicitas Peters as Ida
- Chris Sandford as Hofmann
- Christine Schuberth as Isolda

== Production ==
David Wolper had bought the screen rights to Nabokov's novel immediately after its 1968 publication, but Jerzy Skolimowski was not hired to direct the film until 1971. The film was shot at the Bavaria Studios in Munich, West Germany, and on location in London. Starring David Niven, Gina Lollobrigida and John Moulder-Brown, it was nominated unsuccessfully for the Palme d’Or at the Cannes Film Festival in 1972. It was not released in the US until 1978.

== Reception ==
Although Jonathan Rosenbaum personally liked King, Queen, Knave at its first showing, he recorded that it "probably elicited more boos and jeers than anything else I saw at Cannes". Understandably, he wondered if the audience was expecting a straight transposition of the novel. Later, in an interview given in 1990, Jerzy Skolimowski described the film as the worst of his career and an artistic disaster from which he could not recover for a long time.

However, Nabokov's novels have proved notoriously difficult to film because of their stylistic and experimental qualities and Ewa Mazierska has argued that the subtleties of Skolimowski's adaptation have been overlooked. In her view the film was "an exceptionally good rendition of Nabokov’s novel" from the point of view of trying to capture its literary characteristics rather than remaining faithful to the narrative itself. Where Skolimowski departs from its spirit in particular is in making of the film a vehicle to criticise capitalism rather than (as in Nabokov's own revision of his novel) a criticism of the conditions out of which Fascism was to develop. The superficiality of the characters, for instance, is indirectly suggested by a musical soundtrack in which well-known musical motifs are badly played. Another aspect of the film's characterisation is the further shift in emphasis from the original novel, treating Martha simply as the disposable means by which Frank comes of age.

Time Out has also defended the "surreal black comedy" as "the most unjustly underrated of all Skolimowski's films" and quotes Tom Milne's description of it as "the most Nabokovian film the cinema has thrown up to date".
