= Runaway Railway =

1965 British film by Jan Darnley-Smith

- Directed by: Jan Darnley-Smith
- Screenplay by: Michael Barnes
- Produced by: George H. Brown
- Starring: John Moulder-Brown; Kevin Bennett; Leonard Brockwell
- Cinematography: John Coquillon
- Edited by: John Bloom
- Music by: Burnell Whibley
- Production company: Pinewood Studios
- Release date: 1965
- Running time: 55 minutes
- Country: United Kingdom
- Language: English

Runaway Railway is a 1965 British family adventure film directed by Jan Darnley-Smith and starring John Moulder-Brown, Kevin Bennett, Ronnie Barker and Graham Stark. The screenplay was by Michael Barnes from an original story by Henry Geddes.

== Plot ==
A group of children manage to foil an attempted mail train robbery, with similarities to the Great Train Robbery of 1963.

== Cast ==
- John Moulder-Brown as Charlie
- Kevin Bennett as Arthur
- Leonard Brockwell as John
- Roberta Tovey as Carole
- Sydney Tafler as Mr. Jones
- Ronnie Barker as Mr. Galore
- Graham Stark as Grampole
- Jon Pertwee as stationmaster
- Hugh Lloyd as disposals man
- Roger Avon as Waterhouse
- Bruce Wightman as Llewellyn

== Production ==
It was filmed at Longmoor Military Railway, Paddington Station and Pinewood Studios.

== Reception ==
The Monthly Film Bulletin wrote: "The opportunities afforded by railway trains for high speed and plenty of action are splendidly exploited. In its combination of farcical comedy and railway adventure, this is second only to Oh Mr. Porter!, and cannot fail to delight children. The one criticism that can be levelled against it (surprisingly, in view of the fact that a child audience is well known to be critical, and likely to be well-informed about railways) is that insufficient care was taken with regard to the railway detail. The robbery, for instance, takes place in full view of a nearby signal box, and, incidentally, a signal governing the adjacent track permanently signifies a clear track for a train that never comes. The models that the crooks buy to demonstrate to the children include outmoded raised-base track which, as many juveniles will know, has been off the market for some considerable time. The model Royal Mail van is correct, but the full-sized version in the robbery is an ordinary four-wheel closed van. Rolling stock and tender sides are lettered "L.M.R." (the Longmoor Military Railway was used for the film) but any pretence that this is a mythical "London Midland Railway" is shattered by a British Railways cap. One would have thought it possible to mask the offending lettering for the occasion, and it is easy to imagine indignant correspondence from young critics over these and other discrepancies. In all other respects however, this film is one out of the C.F.F.'s top drawer."

Kine Weekly wrote: "This is a crazy, good-humoured tale and Matilda's mad chase is guaranteed to keep any young audience delightfully excited. Rattling good matinée stuff. Steam locomotives, particularly those that are elderly and decorative, have a special appeal, and there is no argument that Matilda, the engine, is the real star of this very pleasant film. The explanatory preliminaries of the plot are lightened by a mixture of sentiment and humour, and villainy is presented with humorous inefficiency by Sidney Tafler and Ronnie Barker. Other smaller parts give chances to the comic talents of Hugh Lloyd, Graham Stark and Jon Pertwee. The four children are attractive and the dialogue is apt, but the real joy of the picture is Matilda's madcap career along the lines, cunningly photographed to provide the maximum of thrills."
