= Bruce Wightman =

New Zealand actor (1925–2009)

- Born: Bruce Wightman McCombe; 8 March 1925; Auckland, New Zealand
- Died: 8 January 2009 (aged 83); Yeppoon, Queensland, Australia
- Occupation: Actor
- Spouse: Monica Cheek (m. 1952)
- Children: 1

Bruce Wightman (8 March 1925 (Note: This date of birth is most commonly given (such as on his gravestone) although some sources list it as 3 March 1925, 5 March 1925 or 7 March 1925.) – 8 January 2009) was a New Zealand actor and expert on Bram Stoker who co-founded the Dracula Society.

== Early life ==
Coming from a theatrical family, Wightman spent most of his adult life on stage, touring many theatres. In England, he appeared in many films (listed below) and TV shows including ITV Television Playhouse, Hancock's Half Hour, The Diary of Samuel Pepys, Sunday Night Theatre, Dixon of Dock Green, Armchair Theatre, No Hiding Place, Citizen James, Boyd Q.C., The Rag Trade, Suspense, Taxi!, First Night, Crane, Danger Man, Sykes and a..., The Dick Emery Show, Doctor Who, Theatre 625 and Comedy Playhouse.

== The Dracula Society ==
With fellow actor Bernard Davies, Wightman formed The Dracula Society in October 1973, whose purpose was to encourage popular interest in Gothic literature as opposed to Gothic movies. The society was founded to organise Dracula-themed tours of Transylvania, which Bruce ran during the 1970s and 1980s, being awarded Guide of Honour, Romania in February 1981.

The society meets regularly five times a year but also organises occasional one-off events, and trips to locations in the UK and Europe. Honorary members include Caroline Munro, Mark Gatiss, Monty Berman, Michael Carreras and horror legends Vincent Price, Peter Cushing and Christopher Lee (as its president).

Wightman became interested in Dracula after seeing the 1931 film adaptation as a young man (calling its star, Bela Lugosi, the definitive Dracula). In 1977, Wightman appeared in the BBC's adaptation of Count Dracula (playing a coach passenger), as well as working in an advisory capacity on the production.

== Later life ==
In the 1990s, Wightman lived in Bulgaria, working as a journalist and art critic. He returned to his native New Zealand in 2001 to continue writing about the career of Bram Stoker. However, he was living in Australia at the time of his death in 2009. He is buried in Emu Park Cemetery.

== Filmography ==
- Blood of the Vampire (1958) - Third Guard (as Bruce Whiteman)
- I'm All Right Jack (1959) - Shop Steward
- Caught in the Net (1960) - Tom
- Suspect (1960) a.k.a. The Risk - Phil the Barman
- Jigsaw (1962) - 3rd Press Man (uncredited)
- Ladies Who Do (1963) - Bulldozer Driver
- You Must Be Joking! (1965) - Cleaner at Racetrack (uncredited)
- Runaway Railway (1966) - Llewellyn
- Confessions of a Window Cleaner (1974) - Café Owner
