= Margaret Eliot =

English music teacher and musician

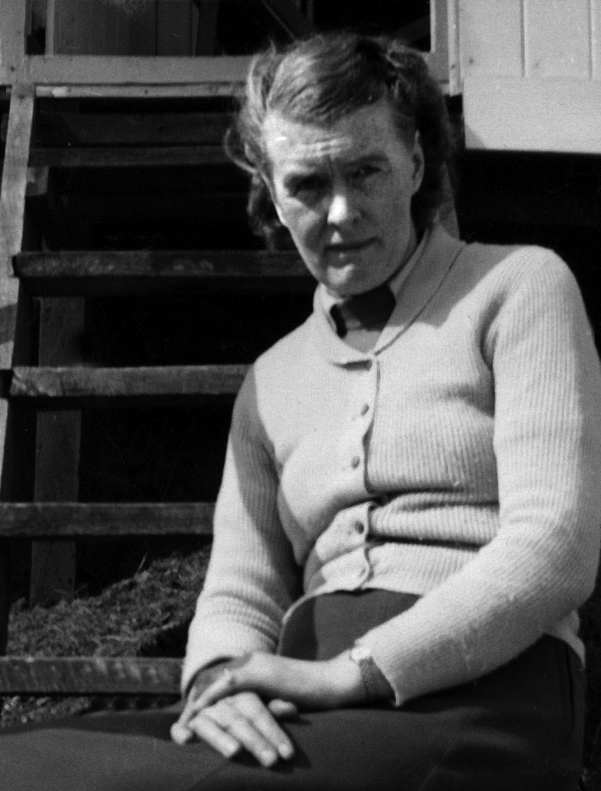
- Born: Margaret Augusta Eliot; 26 February 1914; London, England
- Died: 27 February 2011 (aged 97)
- Occupation: Professor of Oboe
- Spouse: Richard Asher (m. 1943; died 1969)
- Children: 3, including Peter and Jane Asher

Margaret Augusta Eliot (26 February 1914 – 27 February 2011) was an English music teacher and musician. She was a professor of oboe at the Guildhall School of Music and Drama, and her best-known student (from 1948) was George Martin; in 2011, just before her death at age 97, she appeared in the documentary film Produced by George Martin. In the early 1960s she also taught Paul McCartney to play the recorder which he later used on the recording of "The Fool on the Hill".

Eliot was an honorary member of the Royal Academy of Music.

== Family ==
Margaret Eliot was born to Hon. Edward Granville Eliot (1878–1958), a younger brother of both 7th and 8th Earls of St Germans, and his wife, Clare Louise (née Phelips; 1883–1927). She was a great-granddaughter of Edward Granville Eliot, 3rd Earl of St Germans (1798–1877) and Spencer Ponsonby-Fane.

On 27 July 1943, she married Dr Richard Asher (1912–1969); the couple had three children:

1. Peter Asher (born 1944), who was one half of the pop duo Peter & Gordon and successful music producer;
2. Jane Asher (born 1946), the film and TV actress, novelist, and former fiancée of Paul McCartney
3. Clare Asher (born 1948), the radio actress.

Ancestors of Margaret Eliot

8. Edward Eliot, 3rd Earl of St Germans
4. Charles George Cornwallis Eliot
9. Lady Jemima Cornwallis
2. The Hon. Edward Granville Eliot
10. John Josiah Guest
5. Constance Rhiannon Guest
11. Charlotte Bertie
1. Margaret Eliot
12. William Phelips
6. William Robert Phelips
13. Ellen Helyar
3. Clare Louisa Phelips
14. Spencer Ponsonby-Fane
7. Constance Louisa Ponsonby
15. The Hon. Louisa Anne Rose Lee Dillon
