= Four Nights with Anna =

2008 film directed by Jerzy Skolimowski

- Polish theatrical release poster
- Polish: Cztery noce z Anną
- Directed by: Jerzy Skolimowski
- Written by: Jerzy Skolimowski; Ewa Piaskowska
- Produced by: Jerzy Skolimowski; Paulo Branco
- Starring: Artur Steranko; Kinga Preis
- Cinematography: Adam Sikora
- Edited by: Cezary Grzesiuk
- Music by: Michał Lorenc
- Production companies: Alfama Films Production; Skopia Film
- Release dates: 15 May 2008 (Cannes); 12 September 2008 (Poland); 5 November 2008 (France)
- Running time: 87 minutes
- Countries: Poland; France
- Language: Polish
- Budget: €1,860,000
- Box office: $153,604

Four Nights with Anna (Polish: Cztery noce z Anną) is a 2008 drama film directed by Jerzy Skolimowski, written by Skolimowski and Ewa Piaskowska. It stars Artur Steranko and Kinga Preis. It tells the story of a man who visits a woman in her sleep. The film had its world premiere as the opening film of the Directors' Fortnight section at the 2008 Cannes Film Festival on 15 May 2008. It was released in Poland on 12 September 2008, and in France on 5 November 2008.

== Plot ==
In a small town in Poland, an inarticulate man named Leon lives with his bedridden grandmother in a log cabin next to the hospital. Out fishing one day, he stumbles on a rape and the assailant flees. The woman, a nurse at the hospital called Anna, lets him be arrested and jailed. On release, he is given a job in the hospital crematorium and, discovering that the window of Anna's room is within view of his cabin, begins watching her in the evenings.

One night he breaks in and mixes some of his grandmother's sleeping tablets that he has ground up into the sugar that Anna puts into her tea each night. Once she is sound asleep, he starts visiting her room, not exposing her or touching her, except once to paint a toenail, but content just to be in her presence among her things and to do small tasks like sewing on a missing button,

Budget constraints mean that the hospital has to close its crematorium and he is laid off with a terminal payment. He uses it to buy an engagement ring, which he leaves for her one night. Climbing out of her window in a hurry, he stumbles on a police car and, as he is a known rapist, they take him in. At his trial, when the judge asks why he did it, he says “Love”. Anna allows him to be jailed but then visits him there: she says she has known all along that he is innocent and gives him back the ring.

== Cast ==
- Artur Steranko as Leon Okrasa
- Kinga Preis as Anna
- Jerzy Fedorowicz as Hospital director
- Redbad Klijnstra
- Jakub Snochowski
- Barbara Kołodziejska
- Małgorzata Buczkowska
- Anna Lenartowicz
- Urszula Bartos-Gęsikowska
- Anna Szawiel
- Marcin Jędrzejewski
- Zbigniew Konopka
- Judyta Paradzińska
- Witold Wieliński

== Release ==
The film had its world premiere as the opening film of the Directors' Fortnight section at the 2008 Cannes Film Festival on 15 May 2008. It was also screened at the New Horizons Film Festival, the New York Film Festival, the Toronto International Film Festival, the Polish Film Festival, the Lisbon & Estoril Film Festival, and the Trieste Film Festival. It was released in Poland on 12 September 2008, and in France on 5 November 2008.

== Reception ==
=== Critical reception ===
On review aggregator website Rotten Tomatoes, the film has an approval rating of 67% based on 6 reviews, and a weighted average rating of 5.6/10.

Erene Stergiopoulos of Exclaim! wrote, "Quite simply, Four Nights with Anna is as subtle as it is complex, and is definitely one to watch." Derek Elley of Variety commented that "[Jerzy Skolimowski's] period as an artist and poet seems to have served him well, more in the film's overall precision and small details than in its look." Peter Brunette of The Hollywood Reporter described the film as "an exercise in tedium marked by only the tiniest of redeeming moments." Akiva Gottlieb of Slant Magazine gave the film 1.5 out of 4 stars, writing, "Without attempting even a superficial inquiry into the kinks of voyeurism, Skolimowski's return to the big screen is only interested in soiling its viewer with a cheap and gimmicky moral relativism."

== Accolades ==
Award	Year of ceremony	Category	Recipient(s)	Result	Ref(s)
Tokyo International Film Festival	2008	Special Jury Prize	Four Nights with Anna	Won	
Polish Film Awards	2009	Best Director	Jerzy Skolimowski	Won	
Polish Film Awards	2009	Best Cinematography	Adam Sikora	Won	
