= Deep End (film) =

1970 film by Jerzy Skolimowski

- UK theatrical release poster
- Directed by: Jerzy Skolimowski
- Written by: Jerzy Skolimowski; Jerzy Gruza; Boleslaw Sulik
- Produced by: Helmut Jedele
- Starring: Jane Asher; John Moulder-Brown; Diana Dors
- Cinematography: Charly Steinberger
- Edited by: Barrie Vince
- Music by: Cat Stevens; Can
- Production companies: Maran Film; Kettledrum Productions
- Distributed by: Jugendfilm-Verleih (West Germany); Connoisseur Films (United Kingdom)
- Release dates: 1 September 1970 (Venice Film Festival); 25 March 1971 (United Kingdom)
- Running time: 91 minutes
- Countries: West Germany; United Kingdom
- Language: English

Deep End is a 1970 psychological comedy drama film directed by Jerzy Skolimowski and starring John Moulder-Brown, Jane Asher and Diana Dors. It was written by Skolimowski, Jerzy Gruza, and Bolesław Sulik. The film was an international co-production between West Germany and the United Kingdom. Set in London, it centres on a 15-year-old boy who develops an infatuation with his older, beautiful colleague at a suburban bath house and swimming pool.

The film premiered at the Venice Film Festival on 1 September 1970. Deep End, considered a cult classic, went unreleased for many years due to rights issues. In 2011, it was given a digital restoration with the cooperation of the British Film Institute and was released in theatres and on home media.

== Plot ==
Fifteen-year old Mike has left school to work in a public bath in East London. Susan, who is in her mid-twenties, trains Mike. His first female client asks him to help her undress and pushes his head into her bosom, talking amorously about George Best. Mike feels violated, and refuses the tip Susan offers. She explains the flirtatious role-play is normal practice at the baths and encourages him to serve some of her female clients, who will tip well.

Mike, infatuated with Susan, fights with boys making vulgar comments about her and falls into the pool. Susan spies on him changing into dry clothes. Mike discovers that Susan is cheating on her fiancé Chris with Mike's former gym teacher, a married man who brings his female swimming class to the pool. Mike follows Chris and Susan into a soft-core adult movie theatre. Mike sits directly behind the couple. After Susan rejects Chris' physical advances, Mike strokes his face along Susan's arm, then fondles her breast. Susan slaps him and when Chris goes to report the incident to the theatre manager, she kisses Mike deeply.

Mike tries to impress Susan by going to the Soho nightclub Chris takes her to, but he can't afford the cover charge and waits outside eating hotdogs. Down the street, Mike sees an advertising photo cutout of a stripper resembling Susan. He confronts Susan about it on the London Underground. When Susan refuses to answer if she is the woman, Mike angrily leaves her on the Tube. After hours he takes the cutout to the baths and embraces it while swimming naked, imagining he's holding Susan. Mike has been rejecting opportunities for sex, from his ex-girlfriend to a prostitute with a broken leg near the Soho nightclub.

The next morning, Mike jumps into a foot race directed by the gym teacher. He plants glass that punctures the tyres of his car when Susan goes to drive it. She assaults Mike, knocking the diamond out of her engagement ring into the snow. Mike and Susan collect the surrounding snow in plastic bags and take it back to the closed baths to melt it and find the diamond. The gym teacher comes for his keys and Susan runs him off, accusing him of ruining her life by grooming her. Mike finds the diamond and lies down naked with it on his tongue. He won’t give it to her, implying he wants something in return. Susan starts unzipping her clothes but Mike backs down and hands her the diamond. She goes to leave but reconsiders and lies down with him. They have a sexual encounter, which ends suddenly.

Chris telephones, and Susan gathers her clothes to go and meet him. Mike begs her to stay. The pool stoker opens the valve to fill the pool with water. Mike becomes more insistent, holding onto her clothes as she walks in the rapidly filling pool. When she goes to the ladder, Mike petulantly swings the ceiling lamp and hits her head. Dazed and bleeding, she falls under the water, as the lamp knocks cans of red paint into the pool. Mike embraces Susan underwater, just as he pantomimed with the cutout. Water continues to fill the pool, with the live, exposed wire dangling within.

== Cast ==
- John Moulder-Brown as Mike
- Jane Asher as Susan
- Karl Michael Vogler as swimming instructor
- Christopher Sandford as Chris
- Diana Dors as Mike's first lady client
- Louise Martini as prostitute
- Erica Beer as baths cashier
- Anita Lochner as Kathy
- Annemarie Kuster as nightclub receptionist
- Cheryl Hall as red hat girl
- Christina Paul as white cloth girl
- Dieter Eppler as stoker
- Karl Ludwig Lindt as baths manager
- Eduard Linkers as cinema owner
- Will Danin as younger policeman
- Gerald Rowland as Mike's friend
- Burt Kwouk as hot dog stand man
- Ursula Mellin as Mike's second lady client (uncredited)
- Erika Wackernagel as Mike's mother (uncredited)
- Uli Steigberg as Mike's father/policeman (uncredited)
- Martin Urtel as older policeman (uncredited)
- Jerzy Skolimowski as passenger on tube reading Polish newspaper (uncredited)

== Production ==
=== Filming ===
The film was made in about six months from conception to completion. The movie was known during production as Starting Out with finance coming from America and Germany.

It was shot largely in Munich, with some exterior scenes shot in Soho and Leytonstone in London. The cast members could improvise and were told to remain in character even when a scene was not going as planned. Many years after the film's release, Asher denied suggestions that she had used a body double for some of her scenes; "I certainly didn't! ... And, looking back, I like the way it's done".

=== Music ===
The film features the song "Mother Sky" by Can in an extended sequence set in Soho, and "But I Might Die Tonight" by Cat Stevens in the opening scene and finale; the previously unreleased version heard in the film was eventually released in 2020 on a reissue of Stevens' album Tea for the Tillerman.

== Reception ==
=== Critical reception ===
The film received critical acclaim. In The Guardian, Ryan Gilbey wrote: "The consensus when it premiered at the Venice Film Festival in September 1970 was that it would have been assured of winning the Golden Lion, if only the prize-giving hadn't been suspended the previous year". Penelope Gilliatt of The New Yorker called it "a work of peculiar, cock-a-hoop gifts". Variety praised the lead actors and "Skolimowsky's frisky, playful but revealing direction". Nigel Andrews of The Monthly Film Bulletin called the film "a study in the growth of obsession that is both funny and frighteningly exact".

Gene Siskel of the Chicago Tribune gave the film three-and-a-half stars out of four and called it "a stunning introduction to a talented film maker", praising the "delicious humor and eroticism" as Skolimowski "plays with the audience much in the same way that Miss Asher entices Brown". Kevin Thomas of the Los Angeles Times called Deep End "a masterpiece" that "shows Skolimowski to be a major film-maker, impassioned yet disciplined. He runs an eloquent camera and evokes fine performances". Film critic Andrew Sarris described it as "the best of Godard, Truffaut, and Polanski, and then some; nothing less, in fact, than a work of genius on the two tracks of cinema, the visual and the psychological".

Some critics disliked the ending, which they saw as too downbeat and shocking. Some noted said that removing the ending would change nothing in the movie. Roger Ebert of the Chicago Sun-Times gave the film two-and-a-half stars out of four, calling it an "observant and sympathetic movie", but criticizing its ending. Roger Greenspun of The New York Times wrote: "Although it has a strong and good story, Deep End is put together out of individual, usually comic routines. Many of these don't work, but many more work very well." Gary Arnold of The Washington Post wrote: "Judging from Deep End, Skolimowski has a fairly distinctive film personality, but it happens to be a split personality, split in a way – half-Truffaut, half-Polanski – that I find rather disconcerting and unappealing. Imagine a film like Stolen Kisses turning, at about the half-way point, into a film like Repulsion [1965] and you have Deep End."

Critics also lauded Skolimowski's strategic use of colour. In an interview with NME in 1982, David Lynch said of Deep End: "I don't like colour movies and I can hardly think about colour. It really cheapens things for me and there's never been a colour movie I've freaked out over except one, this thing called Deep End, which had really great art direction."

Writing of the film's restoration in 2011, The Guardian's Steve Rose wrote, "Deep End is bravely ambiguous and disjointed, lurching unpredictably between comedy and creepiness; but the characters are bracingly down to earth…In fact, everything about this singular film – the camerawork, the imagery, the soundtrack – feels vibrant and surprising in a way that makes most modern coming-of-age movies look formulaic and, well, shallow." Slant Magazine's Jaime N. Christley praised "Skolimowski's hallucinatory, dissonant, yet compelling tale of hormonal confusion". In The Village Voice, Michael Atkinson called it a "strangely impetuous study of coming-of-age sexual muddle, full of whimsy and abrupt ideas, and intoxicated from a distance, it seems, by Swinging London's free-love commerce".

On the review aggregator website Rotten Tomatoes, the film holds an approval rating of 90% based on 20 reviews, with an average rating of 7.8/10.

=== Accolades ===
Jane Asher was nominated for a BAFTA Award for Best Actress in a Supporting Role.

== Restoration ==
In 2009, Bavaria Media, a subsidiary of Bavaria Film, which co-produced the film in 1970 through its subsidiary Maran Film, began a digital restoration in honor of the film's 40th anniversary, in cooperation with the British Film Institute. The restored film was re-released in UK cinemas on 6 May 2011 and on Blu-ray Disc and DVD on 18 July 2011 as part of the BFI Flipside series. The disc extras included the documentary Starting Out: The Making of Jerzy Skolimowski's Deep End and deleted scenes.
