= Ewa Piaskowska =

Screenwriter and film producer (born 1973)

- Born: 12 October 1973 (age 52); Kolno
- Occupations: Screenwriter, film producer, film editor

Ewa Piaskowska (12 October 1973) is a screenwriter, film editor and producer.

== Biography ==
She was elected a member of Polish Film Academy, European Film Academy and Academy of Motion Picture Arts and Sciences.

== Filmography ==
Source.

=== Screenwriter ===
- Four Nights with Anna (2008)
- Essential Killing (2010)
- EO (2022)
- The Palace (2023)

=== Editor ===
- Owoce miłości (2001)

=== Producer ===
- Essential Killing (2010)
- 11 minutes (2015)
- EO (2022)
- Good Boy (2025)

=== Executive producer ===
- Four Nights with Anna (2008)

=== Co-producer ===
- Ixjana (2012)

== Accolades ==
- Nomination for Polish Academy Award for Best Screenplay for Four Nights with Anna (2009)
- Polish Academy Award for Best Screenplay for EO (2023)
