= Moonlighting (film) =

- Directed by: Jerzy Skolimowski
- Written by: Jerzy Skolimowski
- Produced by: Mark Shivas; Jerzy Skolimowski; Michael White
- Starring: Jeremy Irons
- Cinematography: Tony Pierce-Roberts
- Edited by: Barrie Vince
- Music by: Stanley Myers
- Production companies: Michael White Productions; Channel Four Films
- Distributed by: Miracle Films
- Release date: 26 September 1982
- Running time: 97 minutes
- Country: United Kingdom
- Languages: English; Polish
- Budget: £596,000

Moonlighting is a 1982 British drama film written and directed by Jerzy Skolimowski. It is set in the early 1980s at the time of the Solidarity protests in Poland. It stars Jeremy Irons as Nowak, a Polish builder leading a team working illegally in London.

== Plot ==
Nowak is a master electrician, who arrives in London from Warsaw in December 1981 with three workmen who know no English. He understands the language but not the inhabitants. Their task is to gut and renovate a house, where they also are staying and sleeping in, for which they have brought what tools they can carry, while Nowak has cash of GBP 1,200 to buy materials. The floorboards alone will be costing GBP 320. The men are paid in zlotys, earning in one month a year's salary. Still, the boss living in Poland, and somehow connected to Nowak's wife Anna, is getting his house renovated, with a quarter he should pay for British builders. Since the whole operation is illegal, Nowak keeps them working indoors while he goes out to get food and supplies. They work even on Sundays, skipping the Mass in the local Polish Catholic Church.

They call their loved ones from a phone booth, surprisingly the connection from London to Warsaw is better than vice versa. One night the operator tells Nowak, the lines are cut off because of a military coup in Poland. He rushes to see the tv broadcast in the window of a television shop. He also reads the news from copies of the left-wing Guardian newspaper.

As his money runs out, due to failures in the plumbing work, he takes to stealing so that the four can survive, first an expensive sports bike he uses for transporting his cardboard boxes hiding food stolen from the Lyons supermarket. In the meantime, Poland is undergoing the traumas of demonstrations and strikes followed by the declaration of martial law, the banning of Solidarity, and mass arrests. Nowak conceals all this from the men in order to finish the job. He even rips off the supporting posters and banners of Solidarność on the street nearby. They have to work 18 hours a day to finish the job, Nowak's watch is the only one they are using. He wishes the food he has stolen, can make for the salary the men haven't got, and can take back with them to Poland. On Christmas Day they manage to get a turkey, a Christmas tree and some vodka. On 26th December the men are waiting in vain a call from Poland. He burns a letter that has arrived from Kudaj's wife, asking him to bring home spaghetti and a warm sweater.

The men set up a temporary strike, when Nowak forbids them to attend The New Year's Mass. They have got enough and the rest of the renovation is done on their own terms, working day and night, the noise infuriating the neighbour. Nowak returns the bike to the opposite house. By returning the floor sanding machine, they get back the deposit, GBP 60, with which the men buy gifts. Nowak even manages to shoplift an expensive GBP 48 scarf from a posh Aquascutum shop to Anna.

With no money left (Nowak has 5 pence), they have a six-hour walk to the airport, during which Nowak reveals the situation in Poland to his enraged men. They have a flight home to an uncertain future.

== Cast ==
- Jeremy Irons as Nowak
- Eugene Lipinski as Banaszak, the plumber
- Jirí Stanislav as Wolski
- Eugeniusz Haczkiewicz as Kudaj
- Denis Holmes as Neighbor
- Renu Setna as Junk Shop Owner
- David Calder as Supermarket Manager
- Judy Gridley as Supermarket Supervisor Mrs. Rostrum
- Claire Toeman as Supermarket Cashier
- Catherine Harding as Lady Shoplifter
- Jill Johnson as Haughty Supermarket Customer
- David Squire as Supermarket Assistant
- Michael Sarne as Builders' Merchant (as Mike Sarne)
- Jenny Seagrove as Anna, Nowak's wife
- Lucy Hornak as Wrangler Shop Assistant

== Reception ==
It was entered into the 1982 Cannes Film Festival, where it won the award for Best Screenplay.

Roger Ebert gave it four stars out of four and included it in his list of Best Movies of 1982. Gene Siskel called it his favorite movie of 1982. Vincent Canby, in The New York Times, called Moonlighting "immensely rewarding". He added: "It may be a coincidence – maybe not – that two of the best films ever made about exile have been made by Polish directors", the other being Polanski's The Tenant (1976). Dave Kehr of The Chicago Reader called it "a profound, gripping comedy of terror and isolation, oppression and entrapment" with Jeremy Irons delivering "a performance worthy of Chaplin." He would later hail it as a "masterpiece."

Allmovie gave Moonlighting four out of five stars. On the review aggregator website Rotten Tomatoes, 100% of 10 critics' reviews are positive.
