= Kosmogonia =

1970 composition by Krzysztof Penderecki

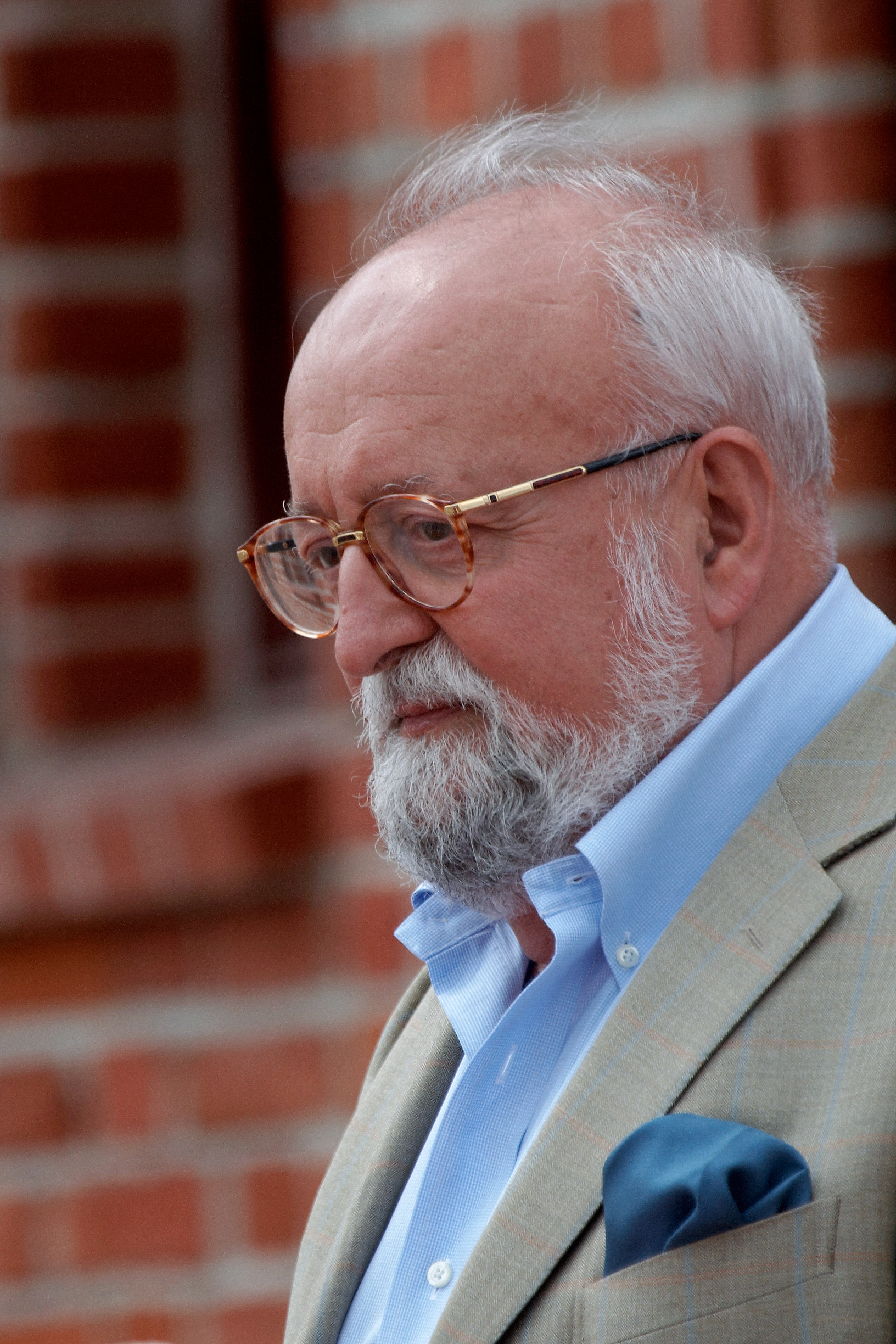
Kosmogonia was composed by Krzysztof Penderecki.

Kosmogonia is a composition by Krzysztof Penderecki.

Kosmogonia (derived from cosmos) was commissioned by and in celebration of the United Nations twenty-fifth anniversary. It was then performed (on October 24, 1970) at the United Nations Headquarters in New York with Zubin Mehta, the choir of Rutgers University and the Los Angeles Philharmonic Orchestra. Penderecki composed the work in his then avant-garde style. The work is written for an extensive line-up, both in choir and in orchestra:

- soloists: soprano, tenor and bass
- mixed choir: sopranos, altos, tenors, baritones
- 4 flutes, of which 2 also piccolo, 4 oboes, 3 clarinets, 1 bass clarinets, 3 bassoons, 1 contra bassoon, 2 alto saxophones, 1 baritone saxophone
- 6 horns, 4 trumpets, 4 trombones, 2 tubas
- 4 male / female percussion, bass guitar, harp, celesta, harmonium, piano, organ
- 24 violins, 10 violas, 10 cellos and 8 double bass

The work was put on LP soon after the premiere by the Polish National Radio Symphony Orchestra with choir conducted by Andrzej Markowski. The next recording of this piece was released in a continuous retrospective by the composer in 2012.
