= Circle of Deceit (1981 film) =

- Directed by: Volker Schlöndorff
- Written by: Volker Schlöndorff; Margarethe von Trotta; Jean-Claude Carriere; Kai Hermann
- Based on: Die Fälschung by Nicolas Born
- Produced by: Eberhard Junkersdorf; Anatole Dauman
- Starring: Bruno Ganz; Hanna Schygulla; Jerzy Skolimowski; Gila von Weitershausen
- Cinematography: Igor Luther
- Edited by: Suzanne Baron
- Music by: Maurice Jarre
- Distributed by: United Artists
- Release dates: 15 October 1981 (Wiesbaden, West Germany); 28 October 1981 (France)
- Running time: 110 minutes
- Countries: West Germany; France; Lebanon
- Languages: German; English; French; Arabic

Circle of Deceit (German title: Die Fälschung, 'the deception'; French title: Le Faussaire) is an anti-war film directed by Volker Schlöndorff and internationally released in 1981. An international co-production, it was an adaptation of Nicolas Born's novel The Deception, which had appeared in 1979. The film follows a German journalist sent to Beirut to report on the Lebanese Civil War, which had begun in 1975.

== Plot ==
Journalist Georg Laschen is sent to Beirut to report on the Lebanese civil war. His feelings about this mission are influenced by the dysfunctionality of his marriage to the unfaithful Greta, who resents his frequent absences for war reporting and remains in Germany with their young children, and his lack of understanding of the conflict.

He feels that his opinions and lack of understanding of events and their background are not respected by his editors because any conflict interests the public. Consequently, he feels that his reports are not real journalism and pretending that they are is deceitful (or in German: Fälschung).

After an affair with a local named Arianna (Hanna Schygulla), he happens to kill a man. He realises how relatively easily one's moral standards can be corrupted in a violent environment and how hard or even impossible it is to remain unbiased as a journalist.

== Cast ==
- Bruno Ganz as Georg Laschen
- Hanna Schygulla as Ariane Nassar
- Jerzy Skolimowski as Hoffmann
- Jean Carmet as Rudnik
- Gila von Weitershausen as Greta Laschen
- Khaled El Sayed as Progressive Officer (uncredited)

== Production ==
The film was shot on location in Beirut. The Lebanese Civil War, which began in 1975, would continue until 1990. The New York Times remarked that it was "filmed in 1980 under remarkable conditions: with its crew confined to "safe" portions of Beirut while the fighting went on elsewhere, but with ubiquitous evidence of real warfare everywhere."

== Reception ==
The New York Times described it as "a balanced, thoughtful, extremely moving vision of wartime tragedy." On the review aggregator website Rotten Tomatoes, 100% of 7 critics' reviews are positive.

== Accolades ==
The film was nominated for the César Award for Best Foreign Film in 1981. Jerzy Skolimowski won the Best Supporting Actor Deutscher Filmpreis in 1982, for his role as the war photographer Hoffmann.

== Soundtrack ==
The original soundtrack music composed by Maurice Jarre for Le Faussaire was released on CD in 2013 by Canadian label Disques Cinemusique.
