= Andrzej Kostenko =

Polish screenwriter, film director and actor (1936–2024)

Andrzej Kostenko (24 June 1936 – 1 June 2024) was a Polish screenwriter, film director, actor and cinematographer from Łódź. He was known for his collaborations with Roman Polanski, including some of Polanski's short films.

Kostenko died on 1 June 2024, aged 87.

== Filmography ==
As a director

- Patience de Maigret (1994)
- Maigret se défend (1993)
- The Evolution of Snuff (1978)
- Sam na sam (1977)
- Rewizja osobista (1973)

As a cinematographer

- Las katynski (1990)
- Rece do góry (1981)
- The Evolution of Snuff (1978)
- Rewizja osobista (1973)
- Qu'est-ce qui fait courir Jacky? (1969)
- Zywot Mateusza (1967)
- Ssaki (1962)

As a writer

- Patience de Maigret (1994)
- Maigret se défend (1993)
- Rece do góry (1981)
- The Evolution of Snuff (1978)
- Sam na sam (1977)Rewizja osobista (1973)
- Départ, Le (1967)

As an actor

- Wszystko na sprzedaz (1969)
- Gdy spadają anioly (1959)
- Zamach (1959)
- Co rekne zena? (1958)
