= Identification Marks: None =

1965 film written and directed by Jerzy Skolimowski

Rysopis (English title: Identification Marks: None)
- Theatrical release poster
- Directed by: Jerzy Skolimowski
- Written by: Jerzy Skolimowski
- Starring: Elżbieta Czyżewska; Jerzy Skolimowski
- Music by: Krzysztof Sadowski
- Release date: 1965
- Running time: 71 minutes
- Country: Poland
- Language: Polish

Identification Marks: None (Polish: Rysopis) is a 1965 Polish drama film directed by Jerzy Skolimowski. It was the first feature film directed by Skolimowski, after the shorts Erotique, Little Hamlet, The Menacing Eye, Boxing and Your Money or Your Life.

The film is the first to feature Skolimowski's alter ego, Andrzej Leszczyc. In 29 shots, it shows Andrzej waking, leaving his sleeping girlfriend as he reports for conscription, having decided to quit his life as a student of ichthyology. The film follows his remaining hours of civilian life.

== Cast ==
- Elżbieta Czyżewska as Teresa/Barbara/Leszczyc's wife
- Jerzy Skolimowski as Andrzej Leszczyc
- Jacek Szczęk as Mundek
- Juliusz Lubicz-Lisowski as man in the telephone booth
- Marek Piwowski as man in the draft office
- Tadeusz Minc
- Andrzej Żarnecki
