= King, Queen, Knave =

1928 novel by Vladimir Nabokov

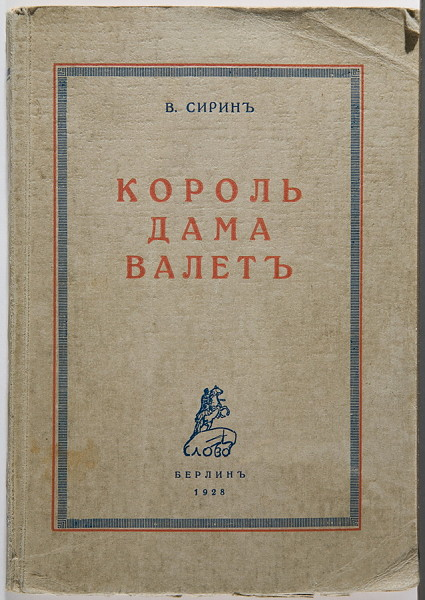
- First edition (Russian)
- Author: Vladimir Nabokov
- Original title: Король, дама, валет (Korol', dama, valet)
- Translator: Dmitri Nabokov and Vladimir Nabokov
- Language: Russian
- Publisher: Slovo (Russia); McGraw-Hill (US); Weidenfeld & Nicolson (UK)
- Publication date: October 1928
- Publication place: Russia
- English publication date: 1968
- Media type: Print (Hardback & Paperback)

King, Queen, Knave is the second novel written by Vladimir Nabokov (under his pen name V. Sirin) while living in Berlin and sojourning at resorts in the Baltic. Written in the years 1927–8, it was published as Король, дама, валет (Korol', dama, valet) in Russian in October 1928 and then translated into German by Siegfried von Vegesack as König, Dame, Bube: ein Spiel mit dem Schicksal. Forty years later the novel was translated into English by Nabokov's son Dmitri, with significant changes made by the author. A film adaptation only loosely based on the novel followed in 1972.

== Plot summary ==
Franz Bubendorf, a young man from a small provincial town, is sent away from home to work in the Berlin department store of his well-to-do "uncle" (actually, his mother's cousin), Kurt Dreyer. On the train ride to Berlin, Franz is seated without realising in the same compartment with Dreyer and Dreyer's young wife, Martha, neither of whom Franz had met. He is immediately enchanted by Martha's beauty and, shortly after Franz begins work at the store, the two initiate a secret love affair in his shabby lodgings.

As the novel continues Martha's distaste for her husband grows more pronounced, and with it her physical demands upon Franz, whose health begins to suffer. As a result, Franz gradually loses any will of his own and becomes a numb extension of his lover, whom he is nevertheless beginning to find repugnant. Dreyer, meanwhile, continues to cherish his wife and is only regretful, not suspicious, when she returns his love with frigidity. He is, in any case, a man of great good humour who continues to make love to a number of other women. The family store also claims his attention, in connection with which he funds an inventor's scheme to create mechanical mannequins.

Martha eventually becomes obsessed with making plans to murder her husband, in which she involves Franz. The trouble is that they cannot come up with a foolproof method until Martha remembers that Dreyer cannot swim and decides the safest way to dispose of him is to push him from a rowing boat into the water. As part of her plans, the three vacation together at a Pomeranian resort on the Baltic Sea. At the last moment, however, the plot is suspended by penny-pinching Martha when she learns from Dreyer that he is about to close a very profitable business deal, selling the mannequin scheme to his American associate Mr Ritter.

On their return, Martha falls ill with pneumonia from the rain and the cold on the boat. Dreyer leaves early next day to finalise his deal in Berlin and Franz is too clueless to get Martha medical help in time. Shortly after Dreyer gets back, Martha dies and he is inconsolable. Relieved by her death, however, Franz is later overheard by a hotel guest as he laughs "in a frenzy of young mirth".

== Themes, foreshadowings ==
"Of all my novels this bright brute is the gayest" Nabokov begins his foreword to the 1968 English translation of King, Queen, Knave. At the date of its composition, "I spoke no German, had no German friends, had not read a single German novel either in original, or in translation." This enabled him to give his imagination free rein in its depiction, veering between the satirical and the comic, of what was by then a barely scandalous, middle-class adultery. Nabokov himself mentioned Anna Karenina and Madame Bovary as literary forerunners of a theme that had become common enough by the time he attempted to breathe new life into it. Nevertheless, émigré reviews had complained of the novel's "coarseness and lewdness".

=== The game of fate ===
Nabokov also admits in his foreword to making changes in order to smooth out inept transitions and to develop possibilities with the benefit of hindsight, using the occasion to develop the kind of verbal games and correspondences that typify his later writing. One of these is connected with the film King, Queen, Knave, described as based on a play by a fictitious "Goldemar", which gives the novel its title. It makes its first appearance at the moment in which Dreyer reminds himself to book rooms for the Baltic holiday in Gravitz. The poster depicts playing card characters in which "the King wore a maroon dressing gown, the Knave a red turtleneck sweater, and the Queen a black bathing suit." These turn out to be items of clothing that the three holiday makers eventually wear in Gravitz. Meanwhile "Goldemar" had been mentioned for a second time as representing the god of chance in his play on the very day that Martha purchases the black bathing suit and Dreyer providentially saves his life by deciding to sell his mannequins to Mr Ritter.

The same "automannequins" contribute once more to Nabokov's favorite doppelgänger theme. In this case the fates of the characters can be read in their performance when demonstrated to Mr Ritter. The male dummy plays with panache; the female dummy's crash foreshadows Martha's demise; the third dummy (corresponding to Franz) is incomplete and unable to fulfil its intended mission. But Nabokov's conjuring tricks do not stop there. The presentation of his characters as unidimensional playing cards in the Goldemar poster, then as performing store dummies, is already dehumanising enough, but in the revised translation of 1968 this is given a satirical and prophetical twist. The portrayal of Franz is that of a German who is easily manipulated and surrenders his moral judgment until, in the book's climactic scene, he is described as having "reached a stage at which human speech, unless representing a command, was meaningless". When Nabokov wrote the story, Nazism was then in its nascent stages, but Franz is made to appear as a "Nazi in the making” in the passage where the narrator prophesies that Franz will eventually be “guilty of worse sins than avunculicide".

=== Authorial presences ===
The author and his wife, though not directly identified, are portrayed near the end of the novel as a happy but "puzzling" couple who are also vacationing in the Baltic resort and speaking in an unidentified foreign tongue. They have a butterfly net, which is taken for a mosquito net by Franz and a shrimp net by Martha, but in the expanded translation Dreyer identifies it correctly. Study of butterflies had been an abiding passion with Nabokov; in a later interview he was to speculate, "It is not improbable that, had there been no revolution in Russia, I would have devoted myself entirely to lepidopterology and never written any novels at all." On seeing the couple later, Franz feels they are discussing him and know "everything about his predicament". When Dreyer reads a list of people in their hotel, the unfamiliar name Blavdak Vinomori strikes him as presumably the name of the male of this couple. It is an anagram of Vladimir Nabokov.

This authorial presence also extends into a corresponding doppelganger in the form of Mr. Vivian Badlook, a "fellow skier and teacher of English", who photographs Dreyer in Davos and whose shadow falls over the photo. The name, another authorial afterthought, is yet one more anagram of Vladimir Nabokov.
