= Andrzej Herder =

Polish actor

Andrzej Herder (31 August 1937, in Warsaw, Poland – 21 May 2002, in Łódź, Poland) was a Polish film and theatre actor.

== Biography ==
Herder was a 1960 graduate of the Acting Department of the National Film School in Łódź. He was awarded the Medal of Honor of Lodz in 1974, Cross of Merit in 1979, and the Order of Polonia Restituta in 1989. He died in 2002, and was buried in the Zarzew Cemetery in Łódź.
