= John Moulder-Brown =

English actor (born 1953)

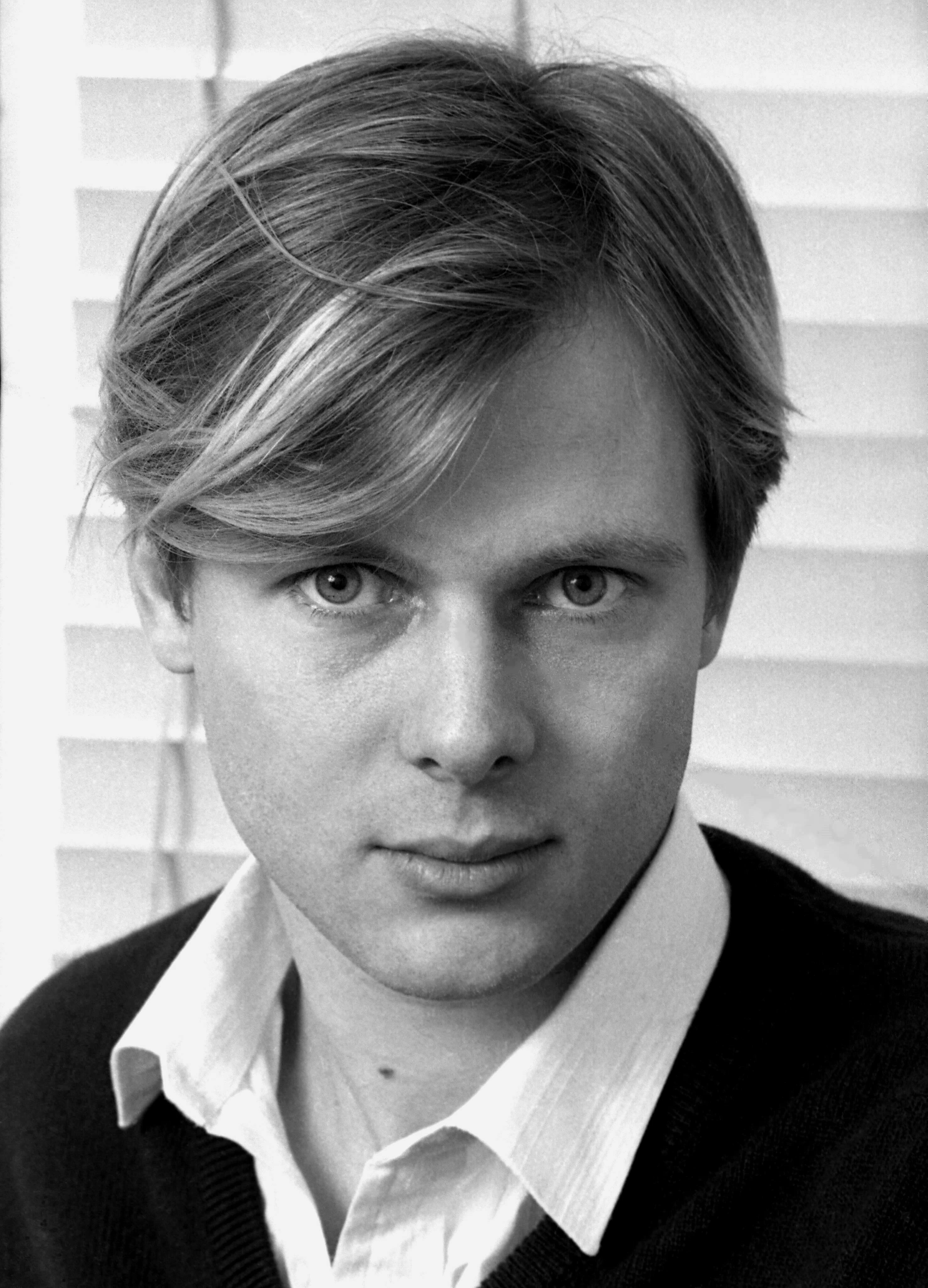
Moulder-Brown in 1979

John Moulder-Brown (born 3 June 1953) is an English actor, known for his appearances in the films The House That Screamed (1969), Deep End (1970), First Love (1970) and Ludwig (1973).

== Biography ==
Moulder-Brown was born in London and began his acting career as a child. In 1982, he acted in George Bernard Shaw's play, Man and Superman, at the Theatre Royal Haymarket in London, alongside Peter O'Toole, Lisa Harrow, James Grout, Michael Byrne, Robert Beatty and Joyce Carey. His next stage appearance was in the play The Table of the Two Horsemen at the Greenwich Theatre, seven years later.

Moulder-Brown founded the Academy of Creative Training, a drama school in Brighton, Sussex, in 1997.

== Filmography ==
=== Film ===
Year	Title	Role	Notes
1958	Carve Her Name with Pride	Child	Uncredited
1958	A Night to Remember	Titanic Passenger	Uncredited
1958	A Cry from the Streets	Jacky	Uncredited
1958	The Man Inside	Boy	Uncredited
1958	Death Over My Shoulder	Boy	Uncredited
1958	Room at the Top	Urchin	Uncredited
1960	Night Train for Inverness	Boy	Uncredited
1960	Doctor in Love	Boy	Uncredited
1961	Two Living, One Dead	Rolf Berger	
1961	The Missing Note	Willie	
1961	Night Without Pity	Geoffrey Martin	
1962	Little Girls Never Cry	Stormont	
1963	55 Days at Peking	Tommy	Uncredited
1964	Becket	Boy	Uncredited
1964	Go Kart Go	Spuggy	As John Moulder Brown
1965	The Heroes of Telemark	Boy	Uncredited
1966	The Uncle	Jamie	
1966	The Quiller Memorandum	Pupil with Inge	Uncredited
1966	Runaway Railway	Charlie	
1966	Operation Third Form	Dick	
1967	Half a Sixpence	Boy	Uncredited
1967	Calamity the Cow	Rob Grant	
1968	Heidi	Peter	As John M. Brown
1968	The Boys of Paul Street	Geréb	
1969	Goodbye, Mr. Chips	Schoolboy	Uncredited
1970	The House That Screamed	Luis	As John Moulder Brown
1970	First Love	Alexander	
1970	Deep End	Mike	As John Moulder Brown
1972	Vampire Circus	Anton	
1972	King, Queen, Knave	Frank	
1973	Ludwig	Prince Otto	As John Moulder Brown
1974	Dites-le avec des fleurs	Jean-Claude Berger	
1974	La madrastra	Daniel	
1975	Forbidden Love Game	Miguel	As John Moulder Brown
1979	Confessions from the David Galaxy Affair	Sergeant Johnson	
1981	Killing Heat	Tony Marston	
1985	Claudia	Gavin	
1986	L'étincelle	Bob	
1987	Rumpelstiltskin	Prince Henry	As John Moulder Brown
2010	Young Alexander the Great	Philip, King of Macedonia	

=== Television ===
Year	Title	Role	Notes
1964	Beware of the Dog	Michael	6 episodes
1966	Weavers Green	Colin Westcott	5 episodes
1967	Comedy Playhouse	Robin Corner	1 episode
1968	The Dickie Henderson Show	Boy	1 episode
1968	The Devil in the Fog	Hotspur Treet	5 episodes
1968	ITV Playhouse	Paul Fawcett	1 episode
1968	Heidi	Peter	TV movie, as John M. Brown
1969	Sexton Blake	Clive Goodside	1 episode
1971	Out of the Unknown	Andrew	1 episode
1973	Away from It All	Philippe	1 episode
1973	ITV Sunday Night Theatre	Jan	1 episode
1976	Victorian Scandals	Wilfrid Blunt	1 episode
1978	The Flockton Flyer	Christopher Bell	1 episode
1978	As You Like It	Hymen	TV movie
1979	The Mill on the Floss	Stephen Guest	5 episodes
1979	A Moment in Time	Bill	3 episodes
1980	Paradise in a Dream	On-screen participant	TV movie
1981	BBC2 Playhouse	Desmond	1 episode
1982	The Confessions of Felix Krull	Felix Krull	5 episodes
1982	Man and Superman	Hector Malone	TV movie
1984	Ellis Island	Terry Billings	3 episodes
1985	Jenny's War	Guy	4 episodes
1985	Royal Match	King Edmund	TV movie
1985	Family Ties Vacation	William Clive-Hopkins	TV movie
1987	Miss Marple: Sleeping Murder	Giles Reed	TV movie
1987	Howards' Way	Richard Spencer	5 episodes
1991	The Bill	Rush	1 episode
1992	Casualty	Hal	1 episode

== Bibliography ==
- Holmstrom, John. The Moving Picture Boy: An International Encyclopaedia from 1895 to 1995. Norwich, Michael Russell, 1996, pp. 299–300.
