= Jakub Goldberg =

Polish scriptwriter, assistant director and actor

- Born: August 29, 1924; Warsaw, Poland
- Died: April 27, 2002 (aged 77); Copenhagen, Denmark

Jakub Goldberg (a.k.a. Kuba Goldberg) (August 29, 1924 in Warsaw, Poland – April 27, 2002 in Copenhagen, Denmark) was a Polish scriptwriter, assistant director, and actor.

A graduate of the prestigious Polish Film School in Łódź, Goldberg was a well-known personality in the post-war Polish film community. He worked as a collaborator and assistant director for Polish film directors such as Andrzej Munk, Jerzy Kawalerowicz, and Roman Polanski. As an actor, most notably, he starred as one of the two men carrying the wardrobe (opposite Henryk Kluba) in Polanski's award-winning landmark short film Two Men and a Wardrobe (1958). He also played the electricity meter man in Polanski's short film When Angels Fall (1959). He was co-writer and assistant director of Polanski's feature debut, Knife in the Water (1962). The Communists forced him to leave Poland, his home, in 1969, and he later became a lecturer at the film academy in Copenhagen.

== Selected filmography ==
=== Actor ===
- Gdy spadają anioły (a.k.a. When Angels Fall ) as the Meter Man (1959)
- Dwaj ludzie z szafą (a.k.a. Two Men and a Wardrobe) as Man with a Wardrobe (1958)

=== Writer ===
- Nóż w wodzie (a.k.a. Knife in the Water) (1962)
