= Astigmatic (album) =

Studio album by Krzysztof Komeda
- Released: 1966
- Recorded: December 5–7, 1965
- Studio: Warsaw Philharmonic
- Genre: Avant-garde jazz, post-bop
- Length: 45:10
- Label: Muza
- Producer: Wojciech Piętowski

Krzysztof Komeda chronology
| Jazz Jamboree '64 vol. 2 (1964) | Astigmatic (1966) | Le Depart (1966) |

Astigmatic is a studio album by Polish jazz pianist and composer Krzysztof Komeda. It is often considered to be Komeda's masterpiece as well as one of the greatest albums of both Polish and European jazz.

== Composition ==
Astigmatic consists of three long tracks, all written by Komeda. "Kattorna" (meaning "female cats" in Swedish) is based on a motif from Komeda's soundtrack for a movie of the same name directed by Henning Carlsen. "Svantetic" is dedicated to Svante Foerster, a Swedish poet who was a friend of Komeda.

The music combines many disparate elements, including modal playing, free jazz-inspired improvisation, precise forms, tone clusters, aleatoric structures and avant-garde use of timbre and articulation, while imbuing them with individual expression and a sense of dramatic lyricism that's been compared to late Romantic music. Tom Ewing of Freaky Trigger comments that the music's astringent high tones evokes the chilly parts of Poland.

== Reception and legacy ==
Professional ratings
Review scores
| Source | Rating |
|---|---|
| The Penguin Guide to Jazz Recordings | + crown |

Authors of The Penguin Guide to Jazz, Richard Cook and Brian Morton, named it as "one of the finest jazz albums ever made in Europe" and included it among their 1001 best jazz records. Critic Stuart Nicholson wrote that it "has become a bellwether for European jazz, with critics pointing to how this album marked a shift away from the dominant American approach with the emergence of a specific European aesthetic". Similarly, Jazzwise magazine stated that it "is one of the most important contributions to the shaping of a European aesthetic in jazz composition", placing it at number 85 in the list The 100 Jazz Albums That Shook the World. Manfred Eicher, the founder of ECM Records, described Astigmatic as a milestone in the history of jazz. It was voted the best album of all time by readers of the Polish Jazz Forum magazine.

Writing about the 2016 reissue, FACT Magazine author Mikey IQ Jones stated: "Komeda's compositions and arrangements are beautiful and complex, and it's the rare epochal album whose power is still potent from the first listen through to its thousandth".

The compositions from Astigmatic have been repeatedly reinterpreted by Polish jazz musicians, including Urszula Dudziak, Michał Urbaniak and Tomasz Stańko. The title of the album Asthmatic by Polish free jazz band Miłość is an ironic reference to Astigmatic.

== Track listing ==
All tracks composed by Krzysztof Komeda.

Side A
| No. | Title | Length |
|---|---|---|
| 1. | "Astigmatic" | 22:50 |

Side B
| No. | Title | Length |
|---|---|---|
| 2. | "Kattorna" | 7:20 |
| 3. | "Svantetic" | 15:50 |

== Personnel ==
=== Komeda Quintet ===
- Krzysztof Komeda – bandleader, piano
- Rune Carlsson – drums
- Günter Lenz – double bass
- Zbigniew Namysłowski – alto saxophone
- Tomasz Stańko – trumpet

=== Additional personnel ===
- Wojciech Piętowski – production
- Halina Jastrzębska – engineering
- Rosław Szaybo – cover design
- Marek Karewicz – cover photo
- Adam Sławiński – liner notes
