= Jolanta Umecka =

Polish actress and musicologist

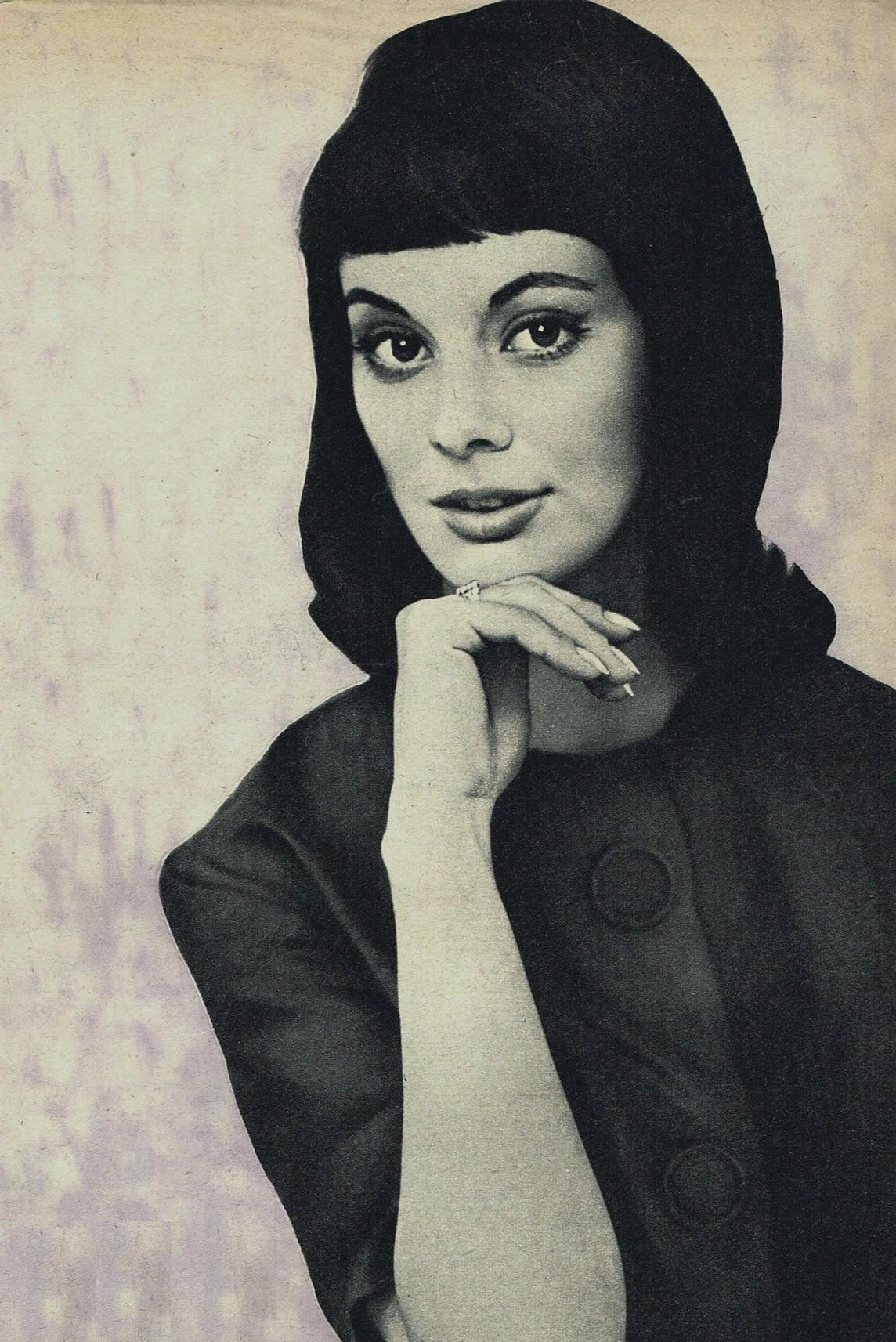
- Jolanta Umecka in 1963
- Born: 17 March 1937 (age 89); Warsaw, Poland
- Occupations: Actress, musicologist, music educator
- Years active: 1961–1966

Jolanta Umecka (born 17 March 1937) is a Polish former actress and musicologist. She is best known for her role as Krystyna in Knife in the Water (1962), directed by Roman Polański, a film that received an Academy Award nomination for Best Foreign Language Film.

== Early life and education ==
Umecka was born in Warsaw. In 1963, she graduated from the State Higher School of Music in Warsaw (now the Fryderyk Chopin University of Music), earning a master's degree in music theory. Her thesis focused on educational aids for music instruction in primary-level music schools.

During her studies, she also took part in scholarly work on the history of the Warsaw Institute of Music and Conservatory between 1858 and 1918.

== Career ==
While still a student, Umecka was cast in Knife in the Water (1962), in which she played one of the film's three central characters. The film brought her international recognition and was nominated for the Academy Award for Best Foreign Language Film.

She subsequently appeared in several films, including The Red Berets (1962), Echo (1964), Pięciu (1964), and the Czechoslovak production Panna zázračnica (1966). In addition to feature films, she also appeared in commercial advertising productions during the 1960s.

In 1963, she became the first actress from Central and Eastern Europe to appear on the cover of Time, featured in a still from Knife in the Water.

After completing her studies, Umecka chose not to pursue a long-term acting career, instead returning to her trained profession as a musicologist. Following her departure from the film industry, she married and worked under the name Jolanta Kulczycka as a music teacher in Warsaw, teaching in primary education and later at a teacher training institution.

== Other activities ==
Umecka was active in the Warsaw branch of the Polish Union of Musicians and participated in initiatives related to music education, including work with the Commission for Music Education in the mid-1960s. She also took part in public cultural events, including art auctions organized in collaboration with actor and cultural figure Wojciech Siemion.

== Selected filmography ==
- Knife in the Water (1962)
- The Red Berets (1962)
- Echo (1964)
- Pięciu (1964)
- Panna zázračnica (1966)
