= Rosław Szaybo =

Polish painter, photographer, and cover designer (1933–2019)

- Born: 13 August 1933; Poznań, Poland
- Died: 21 May 2019 (aged 85); Warsaw, Poland
- Education: Academy of Fine Arts in Warsaw
- Occupations: Painter; photographer; cover designer

Rosław Szaybo (13 August 1933, Poznań – 21 May 2019, Warsaw) was a Polish painter, photographer and cover designer.

He graduated in 1961 from the Academy of Fine Arts in Warsaw, and was mentored by Wojciech Fangor and Henryk Tomaszewski.

In 1966 he moved to United Kingdom where he worked as an independent designer. Between 1968 and 1972 worked as an art director for the advertising company Young & Rubicam.

Between 1972 and 1988 he was signed as the chief artistic director at CBS Records, where he designed over 2000 album covers, mostly for classical music, but also for artists like Elton John, Roy Orbison, Santana, Janis Joplin, The Clash, Mott the Hoople, Judas Priest and John Williams.

During his work in the UK, he also designed posters for English theatres.

Upon his return to Poland in 1993 he started a photography workshop at the Academy of Fine Arts in Warsaw, and also became artistic director at the Czytelnik publishing house.

Amongst Szaybo's most recognisable works are the covers for English heavy metal band Judas Priest's albums Sin After Sin, Stained Class, Killing Machine, British Steel, Point of Entry and as well as devising the band's logo. Szaybo also designed the cover for Polish jazz pianist Krzysztof Komeda's album Astigmatic.

== Honours ==
- Gold Medal for Merit to Culture – Gloria Artis (2018)
- Silver Medal for Merit to Culture – Gloria Artis (2013)
