= Krzysztof Komeda =

Polish composer and jazz pianist (1931–1969)

- Born: Krzysztof Trzciński; 27 April 1931; Poznań, Poland
- Died: 23 April 1969 (aged 37); Warsaw, Poland
- Resting place: Powązki Cemetery, Warsaw
- Other name: Christopher Komeda
- Occupations: Composer; musician
- Years active: 1952–1969
- Spouse: Zofia Tittenbrun Trzcińska (m. 1958)
- Musical career
- Genres: Jazz; Film music
- Instruments: Piano
- Label: Polskie Nagrania Muza

Krzysztof Trzciński (27 April 1931 – 23 April 1969), known professionally as Krzysztof Komeda, was a Polish film composer and jazz pianist widely regarded as one of the most influential Polish musicians. He is best known for writing the scores for Roman Polanski's films Knife in the Water (1962), Cul-de-sac (1966), The Fearless Vampire Killers (1967), and Rosemary’s Baby (1968).

Komeda's album Astigmatic (1965) is often considered one of the most important European jazz albums. British critic Stuart Nicholson describes the album as "marking a shift away from the dominant American approach with the emergence of a specific European aesthetic." Komeda is also known for blending jazz with classical and traditional Polish music.

== Life and career ==
=== Early life and education ===
He was born Krzysztof Trzciński on 27 April 1931 in Poznań to father Mieczysław and mother Zenobia (née Gębicka). He chose Komeda as his stage name only upon graduation from university as a means of distancing himself as a jazz musician from his daytime job in a medical clinic.

He grew up in Częstochowa and Ostrów Wielkopolski where in 1950 he graduated from the 'liceum (high school) for Boys'. While at school, he participated in the Music and Poetry Club. After high school he entered the Medical Academy in Poznań to study medicine. He finished his six-year-long studies and obtained a medical doctor diploma in 1956. He chose to specialize as an otolaryngology physician.

He took music lessons from early childhood; to become a virtuoso was his dream. He became a member of the Poznań conservatorium at the age of eight, but World War II thwarted his plans. Komeda explored the theory of music, and learned to play piano, during this period and later, until 1950; however, he was aware of the loss of the past six years.

=== Career beginnings ===
Komeda was interested in light and dance music. He met Witold Kujawski, a graduate of the same school and active as a swing bass player, at the gymnasium (high school) in Ostrów Wielkopolski. It was Kujawski who acquainted Komeda-Trzciński with jazz, and took him to Kraków. The romantic period of Polish jazz, called the catacombs, had its day in the spotlight. Jam sessions, in which such musicians as Matuszkiewicz, Borowiec, Walasek and Kujawski himself participated, took place in Witold's small apartment in Kraków.

Several years later, it became clear why Komeda was fascinated with be-bop performed by Andrzej Trzaskowski. The fascination with jazz and the friendship with other musicians strengthened his connections with music, even though he was a doctor by profession. He worked for some time with the first, postwar, pioneer Polish jazz band, a group called Melomani that was from Kraków and Łódź, whose mainstays were Matuszkiewicz, Trzaskowski and Kujawski.

Later, he played with pop groups from Poznań. One of them, Jerzy Grzewiński's group, soon transformed into a dixieland band. Komeda appeared with Grzewiński on the I Jazz Festival in Sopot in August 1956, but he achieved success performing with saxophonist Jan "Ptaszyn" Wróblewski and vibraphonist Jerzy Milian, because dixieland did not meet Komeda's expectations at the time. He was more fascinated with modern jazz. Thanks to this passion, the Komeda Sextet was created. Krzysztof Trzciński used the stage name 'Komeda' for the first time when he worked at a laryngological clinic, and wanted to conceal his interest in jazz from co-workers. Jazz was beginning its struggle for respectability with the communist authorities in the era of "The Thaw" and with Polish society and was gradually recognized by both. In the 1960s, jazz musicians started to be invited to prominent concert halls in Warsaw.

The Komeda Sextet became the first Polish jazz group playing modern jazz, and its pioneering performances opened the way for jazz in Poland. He played jazz that related to European traditions and which was the combination of two of the most popular American groups at that time: the Modern Jazz Quartet and the Gerry Mulligan Quartet.

In the thirteen years after the I Sopot Jazz Festival, the artistic personality of Krzysztof Trzciński became more mature, crystallized and lyrically poetic. Komeda was a constantly searching poet who could find ways of individual expression of himself within jazz, Slavic lyricism, European sensibility and in the traditions of Polish music.

=== 1960s ===
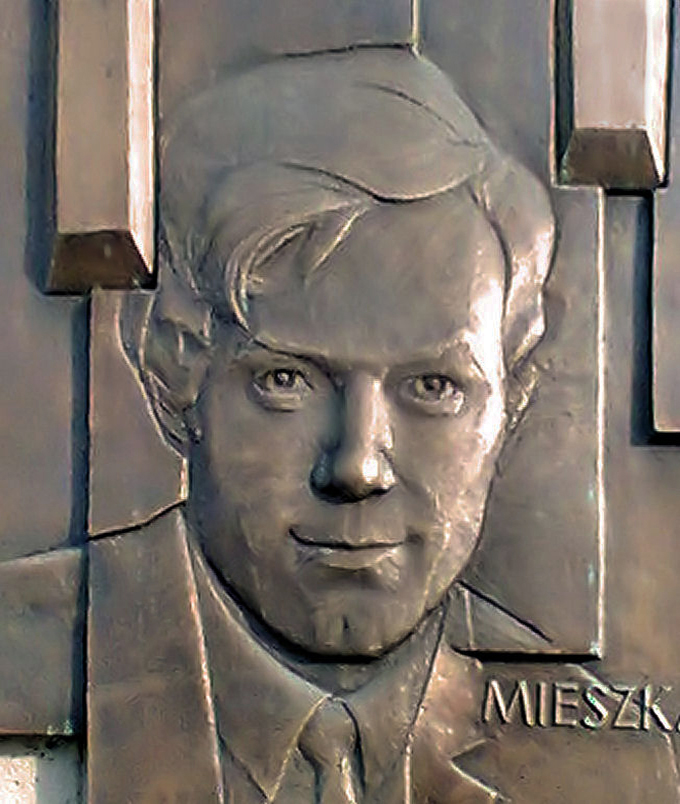
Krzysztof Komeda, fragment of commemorative plaque in Poznań

The years 1956–1962 saw Komeda with his group taking part in domestic festivals and preparing ambitious programs. These were also the years of his first foreign successes in Moscow, Grenoble and Paris. A "Jazz and Poetry" programme was prepared for Jazz Jamboree '60, and later in Warsaw Philharmonic. Komeda's adventure with film music also began by this time. Scores for the films of Roman Polanski such as Knife in the Water (1962), of Andrzej Wajda such as Innocent Sorcerers (1960), and of Janusz Morgenstern Good Bye, Till Tomorrow (also 1960) were created. This period, which in Komeda's artistic biography can be called the period of growing up and improving his own music language, was crowned with "Ballet Etudes" performed on Jazz Jamboree '62. Although the reaction of domestic critics for the Etudes was rather cold, it opened the doors to Europe for Komeda.

Komeda visited Scandinavia for the first time in spring 1960, and he went back there every year thereafter. All of his performances at the 'Gyllene Cirkeln' (Golden Circle) in Stockholm and at the Montmartre Jazz Club in Copenhagen were a success. The Danish director Hennig Carlsen ordered music for his movies Hvad Med Os and Sult (the movie based on Knut Hamsun's novel Hunger). Komeda also wrote the music for Henning Carlsen's film The Cats (Kattorna, 1965). Overall Komeda wrote more than 70 soundtracks. After successes in Scandinavia, came further successes: jazz festivals in Prague, Blend, Koenigsberg; tours of Bulgaria and both West and East Germany. Komeda stayed in Los Angeles in 1968 where he composed film music for Roman Polanski's Rosemary’s Baby (with one of his most recognizable compositions, "Rosemary's Lullaby" sung by Mia Farrow) and Buzz Kulik's Riot.

=== Accident and death ===
In December 1968, in Los Angeles, Komeda had a tragic accident which led to a haematoma of the brain. He was pushed off an escarpment by writer Marek Hłasko during a drinking party. Roman Polański mentioned in his memoirs that as a result of friendly rough-and-tumble with Marek Hłasko, Komeda fell down and suffered head injuries. Medical treatment in the US hospital did not save his life. After being transported home to Poland in a coma and in a terminal state, he died in April 1969, aged 37. Hłasko, who was tormented by a sense of guilt, himself died just two months later at the age of 35. Komeda was buried at the Powązki Cemetery in Warsaw.

== Remembrance ==
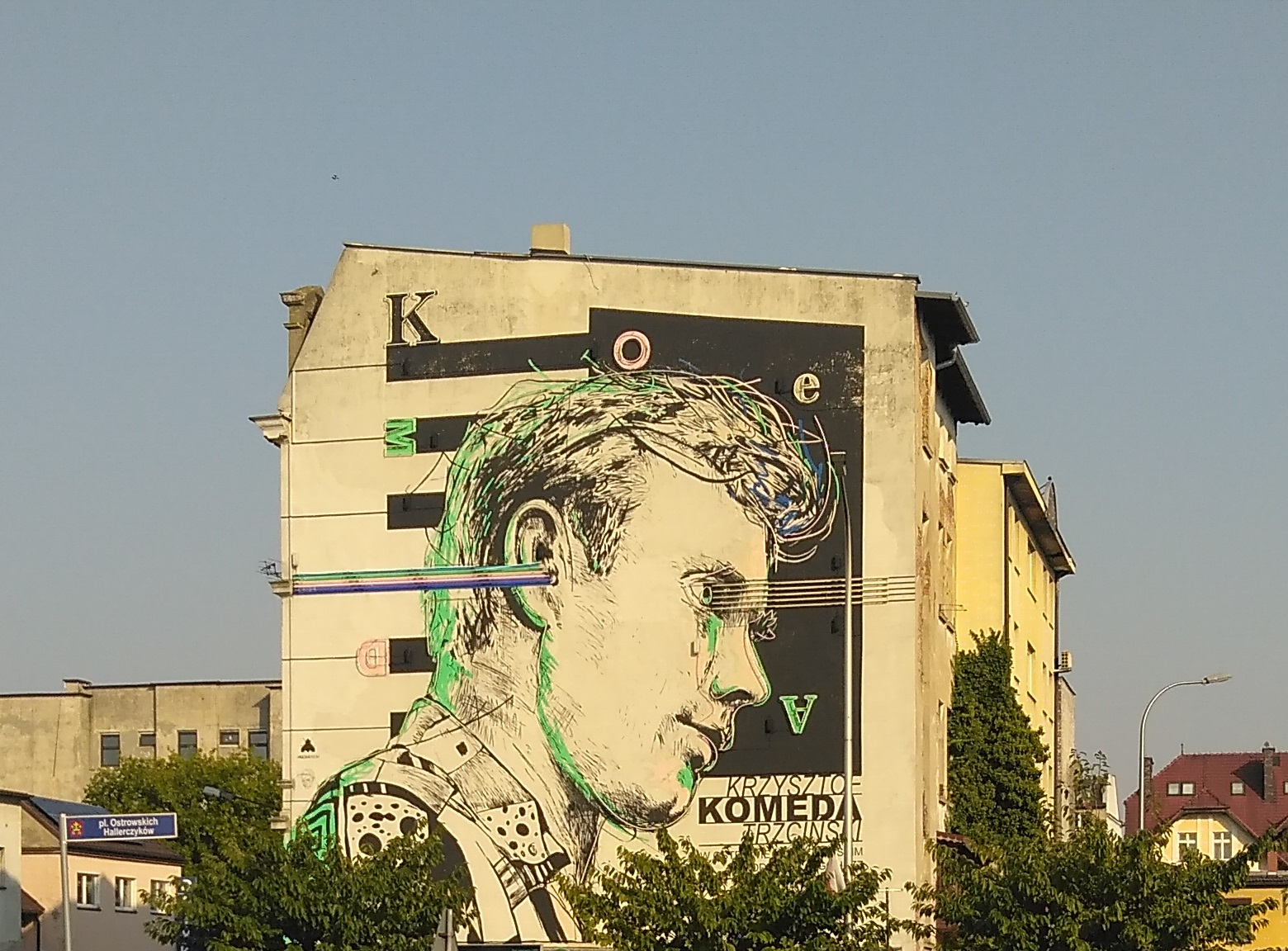
Komeda mural in Ostrów Wielkopolski where the composer grew up.

As a jazz musician, he exerted a crucial influence on creating an original style, often described as the Polish school of jazz, which subsequently influenced the Polish jazz scene's development after his death. Since 1995, the Komeda Jazz Festival has been held on a regular basis, including an International Composers' Competition. The goal of the competition is to promote young artists.

In 1991, a street named in honour of Komeda was opened in Warsaw in the Mokotów District.

In 2008, a commemorative plaque in honour of Komeda was unveiled on the building of the National Bank of Poland in Warsaw. Another commemorative plaque was unveiled in Częstochowa in 2024.

In 2010, the National Bank of Poland issued a commemorative coin dedicated to Komeda in the "Polish Popular Music" series. The same year, a statue honoring the composer was ceremonially unveiled in Poznań.

In 2012, a crater on the planet Mercury was named in honor of Komeda by the International Astronomical Union.

Between 2019–2020, a series of concerts titled "The Road to Hollywood. Krzysztof Komeda. 50th Anniversary" took place in numerous locations across the whole of Poland.

== Discography ==
=== Albums ===
- I Sopot Jazz Festival 1956 (Muza)
- Crazy Girl (1962, Muza), a.k.a. Jazz Jamboree'61 nr. 4, "Bernt Rosengren with Komeda Trio – Soundtrack from the Motion Picture Knife in the Water", 7" single with four tracks
- Etiudy Baletowe ("Ballet Etudes") (1963, Metronome), "the music of Komeda – a jazz message from Poland presented by an international quintet"
- Jazz Jamboree'64 vol. 2 (1964, Muza)
- Astigmatic (1966, Muza)
- Meine süsse europäische Heimat (Dichtung & Jazz aus Polen) (1967, Columbia [EMI Germany]), "poetry and jazz from Poland"
- The Riot (1968)

=== Compilations ===
- Muzyka Krzysztofa Komedy vol. 1-4 (1974, Muza)
- Krzysztof Komeda (1989, Muza)
- The Complete Recordings of Krzysztof Komeda vol. 1-23 (1994-98 Polonia)
- Genius of Krzysztof Komeda vol. 1-14 (1996–2005 Power Bros)
- Zofia Komeda Presents vol. 1-14 (1998–2005, Power Bros)

=== Appeared on ===
- I Sopot Jazz Festival 1956 (Muza)
- Jazz Believers (1958, RCA Victor)
- Jazz Jamboree'60 nr. 4 (1960, Muza)
- Jazz Jamboree'60 nr. 1 (1961, Muza)
- Jazz Jamboree'60 nr. 2 (1961, Muza)
- Jazz Jamboree'60 nr. 4 (1961, Muza)
- Jazz Greetings from the East (1964, Fontana)

=== Film scores ===
- Dwaj ludzie z szafą (1958) a.k.a. Two Men and a Wardrobe
- Gdy spadają anioły (1959) a.k.a. When Angels Fall
- Do widzenia, do jutra (1960) a.k.a. Good Bye, Till Tomorrow
- Niewinni czarodzieje (1960) a.k.a. Innocent Sorcerers
- Szklana gora|Szklana góra (1960) a.k.a. Glass Mountain
- Ambulans (1961) (credited as Krzysztof Komeda-Trzciński)
- Cmentarz Remu (1961)
- Le Gros et le Maigre (1961) a.k.a. The Fat and the Lean
- Jutro premiera (1962) a.k.a. Opening Tomorrow
- Nóż w wodzie (1962) a.k.a. Knife in the Water
- Ssaki (1962) a.k.a. Mammals (USA)
- Wyrok (1962) a.k.a. The Verdict
- Hvad med os? (1963) a.k.a. Epilogue
- Smarkula (1963) a.k.a. Teenager
- Zbrodniarz i panna (1963) a.k.a. The Criminal and the Lady
- Les Plus belles escroqueries du monde, segment "La Rivière de diamants" (1964) a.k.a. World's Greatest Swindles, "The River of Diamonds"
- Kattorna (1965) a.k.a. The Cats (USA)
- Pingwin (1965) a.k.a. Penguin
- Bariera (1966) a.k.a. Barrier
- Cul-de-Sac (1966, Polydor)
- Sult (1966) a.k.a. Hunger
- Markiza de Pompadour (1966)
- Niekochana (1966) a.k.a. Unloved
- Perły i dukaty (1966)
- Ping-pong (1966)
- Prawo i pięść (1966) a.k.a. The Law and the Fist
- Przedświąteczny wieczór (1966) a.k.a. Evening Before Christmas
- Le Départ (1967, Philips)
- Människor möts och ljuv musik uppstår i hjärtat (1967) a.k.a. People Meet
- The Fearless Vampire Killers (1967)
- Mia and Roman (1968)
- Rosemary's Baby (1968, Dot)
- Riot (1969)
- Hør, var der ikke en som lo? (1978) a.k.a. Did Somebody Laugh?
- Ręce do góry (1981) a.k.a. Hands Up!
- The Kid Stays in the Picture (2002) (from Rosemary's Baby and Lullaby)
- Łódź płynie dalej (2004)
