= Ruth Kasdan =

Swedish actress

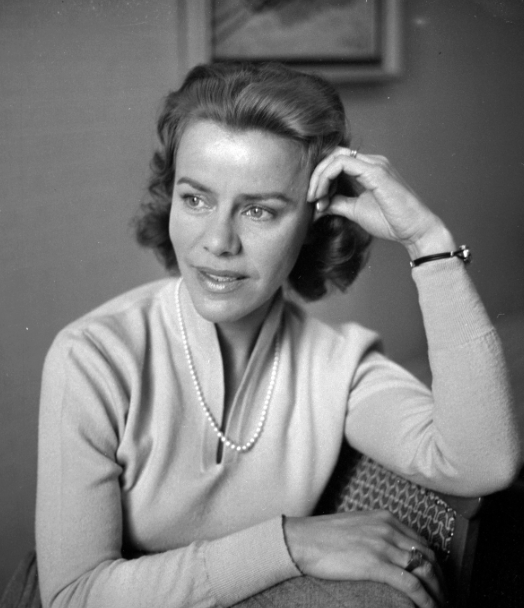
- Kasdan in 1956.
- Born: 30 October 1918; Stockholm, Sweden
- Died: 11 June 2008 (aged 89); Stockholm, Sweden
- Occupation: Actress
- Years active: 1944–1980 (film & TV)

Ruth Kasdan (1918–2008) was a Swedish stage and film actress and singer.

She appeared in the 1945 romantic comedy In the Arms of Roslagen alongside Åke Grönberg and Wera Lindby.

== Selected filmography ==
- Prince Gustaf (1944)
- The Girls in Smaland (1945)
- In the Arms of Roslagen (1945)
- When Love Came to the Village (1950)
- In the Arms of the Sea (1951)
- The Beat of Wings in the Night (1953)
- The Cats (1965)

== Bibliography ==
- Steene, Birgitta. Ingmar Bergman: A Reference Guide. Amsterdam University Press, 2005.
- Wright, Rochelle. The Visible Wall: Jews and Other Ethnic Outsiders in Swedish Film. SIU Press, 1998.
