= Two Men and a Wardrobe =

- Opening titles
- Polish: Dwaj ludzie z szafą
- Directed by: Roman Polanski
- Written by: Roman Polanski
- Starring: Jakub Goldberg; Henryka Klube
- Cinematography: Maciej Kijowski
- Music by: Krzysztof T. Komeda
- Production company: Panstwowa Wyzsza Szkola Filmowa
- Release dates: April 1958 (SFIFF); 1 June 1959 (ADLFF)
- Running time: 15 min
- Country: Poland
- Language: Polish

Two Men and a Wardrobe (Polish: Dwaj ludzie z szafą) is a 1958 Polish short black and white silent movie directed and written by Roman Polański.

== Plot ==
The film features two men, played by Jakub Goldberg and Henryk Kluba, who emerge from the sea carrying a large wardrobe, which they proceed to carry into a town. Carrying the wardrobe, the two encounter a series of hostile events, including being attacked by a group of youths (one of whom is played by Polanski himself). Finally, they arrive back at a beach and then disappear in the sea.
