= List of awards and nominations received by Roman Polanski =

Roman Polanski awards and nominations
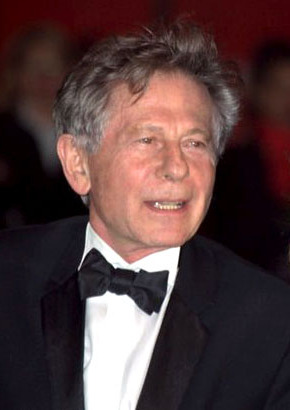
Awards and nominations
| Award | Wins | Nominations |
| Academy Award | 1 | 5 |
| British Academy Film Award | 3 | 3 |
| Golden Globe Award | 2 | 4 |

Roman Polanski is a Polish and French film director, producer, writer, and actor.

He has received five Academy Award nominations winning for Best Director for The Pianist (2002). He was previously nominated for Rosemary's Baby (1968), Chinatown (1974), and Tess (1979). He received two British Academy Film Awards for Best Direction for Chinatown and The Pianist. He also earned four Golden Globe Award nominations winning twice for Chinatown and Tess. He earned the Palme d'Or at the Cannes Film Festival for The Pianist.

== Industry awards ==
=== Academy Awards ===
| Year | Category | Nominated work | Result | Ref. |
|---|---|---|---|---|
| 1969 | Best Adapted Screenplay | Rosemary's Baby | Nominated | |
| 1975 | Best Director | Chinatown | Nominated | |
| 1981 | Best Director | Tess | Nominated | |
| 2003 | Best Director | The Pianist | Won | |
| 2003 | Best Picture | The Pianist | Nominated | |

=== British Academy Film Awards ===
| Year | Category | Nominated work | Result | Ref. |
|---|---|---|---|---|
| 1975 | Best Direction | Chinatown | Won | |
| 2003 | Best Direction | The Pianist | Won | |
| 2003 | Best Film | The Pianist | Won | |

=== César Awards ===
| Year | Category | Work | Result | Ref. |
|---|---|---|---|---|
| 1979 | Best Film | Tess | Won | |
| 1979 | Best Director | Tess | Won | |
| 2002 | Best Film | The Pianist | Won | |
| 2002 | Best Director | The Pianist | Won | |
| 2010 | Best Director | The Ghost Writer | Won | |
| 2010 | Best Adaptation | The Ghost Writer | Won | |
| 2011 | Best Adaptation | Carnage | Won | |
| 2013 | Best Film | Venus in Fur | Nominated | |
| 2013 | Best Director | Venus in Fur | Won | |
| 2013 | Best Adaptation | Venus in Fur | Nominated | |
| 2019 | Best Film | An Officer and a Spy | Nominated | |
| 2019 | Best Director | An Officer and a Spy | Won | |
| 2019 | Best Adaptation | An Officer and a Spy | Won | |

=== Golden Globe Awards ===
| Year | Category | Nominated work | Result | Ref. |
|---|---|---|---|---|
| 1975 | Best Director | Chinatown | Won | |
| 1981 | Best Director | Tess | Nominated | |
| 1981 | Best Foreign Film | Tess | Won | |
| 2003 | Best Motion Picture - Drama | The Pianist | Nominated | |

== Festival awards ==
=== Cannes Film Festival ===
| Year | Category | Work | Result | Ref. |
|---|---|---|---|---|
| 1976 | Palme d'Or | The Tenant | Nominated | |
| 2002 | Palme d'Or | The Pianist | Won | |
| 2013 | Palme d'Or | Venus in Fur | Nominated | |

=== Berlin International Film Festival ===
| Year | Category | Work | Result | Ref. |
|---|---|---|---|---|
| 1965 | Silver Berlin Bear-Extraordinary Jury Prize | Repulsion | Won | |
| 1965 | FIPRESCI Prize | Repulsion | Won | |
| 1966 | Golden Bear | Cul-de-sac | Won | |
| 2010 | Silver Bear for Best Director | The Ghost Writer | Won | |

=== New York Film Critics Circle ===
| Year | Category | Work | Result |
|---|---|---|---|
| 1965 | Best Director | Repulsion | Nominated |
| 1965 | Best Screenplay | Repulsion | Nominated |
| 1971 | Best Film | Macbeth | Nominated |
| 1971 | Best Director | Macbeth | Nominated |
| 1980 | Best Director | Tess | Nominated |
| 1980 | Best Foreign Film | Tess | Nominated |

=== Venice Film Festival ===
| Year | Category | Work | Result | Ref. |
|---|---|---|---|---|
| 1962 | FIPRESCI Prize | Knife in the Water | Won | |
| 1966 | National Syndication of Italian Film Journalists | Cul De Sac | Nominated | |
| 1993 | Career Golden Lion | Himself | Won | |
| 2019 | Grand Jury Prize | An Officer and a Spy | Won | |
| 2019 | FIPRESCI Prize | An Officer and a Spy | Won | |

=== Other awards ===
| Year | Award | Category | Work | Result | Ref. |
|---|---|---|---|---|---|
| 1975 | Bodil Awards | Best American Film | Chinatown | Won | |
| 2021 | Bodil Awards | Best Non-American Film | An Officer and a Spy | Nominated | |
| 2004 | Karlovy Vary International Film Festival | Crystal Globe | The Pianist | Won | |
| 2004 | Argentine Film Critics Association | Best Foreign Film | The Pianist | Nominated | |
| 2006 | Warsaw Jewish Film Festival | David's Camera Award | | Won | |
| 2006 | European Film Awards | Lifetime Achievement Award | Himself | Won | |
| 2009 | Zürich Film Festival Golden Icon Award | Lifetime achievement | | Won | |
| 2010 | European Film Awards | Best Film | The Ghost Writer | Won | |
| 2010 | European Film Awards | Best Director | The Ghost Writer | Won | |
| 2010 | European Film Awards | Best Screenwriter | The Ghost Writer | Won | |
| 2010 | Lumière Awards | Best Director | The Ghost Writer | Won | |
| 2010 | Lumière Awards | Best Screenwriter | The Ghost Writer | Won | |
| 2010 | San Sebastián Film Festival | FIPRESCI Grand Prix | The Ghost Writer | Won | |
| 2003 | David di Donatello Awards | Best Foreign film | The Pianist | Won | |
| 2020 | David di Donatello Awards | Best Foreign film | An Officer and a Spy | Won | |
| 1969 | David di Donatello Awards | Best Foreign Director | Rosemary's Baby | Won | |
| 1999 | Stockholm Film Festival | Lifetime Achievement Award | Himself | Won | |
| 2017 | Stockholm Film Festival | FIPRESCI Prize | Based on a True Story | Won | |
