= Komeda Jazz Festival =

Coordinates: 54°27′47″N 17°01′49″E

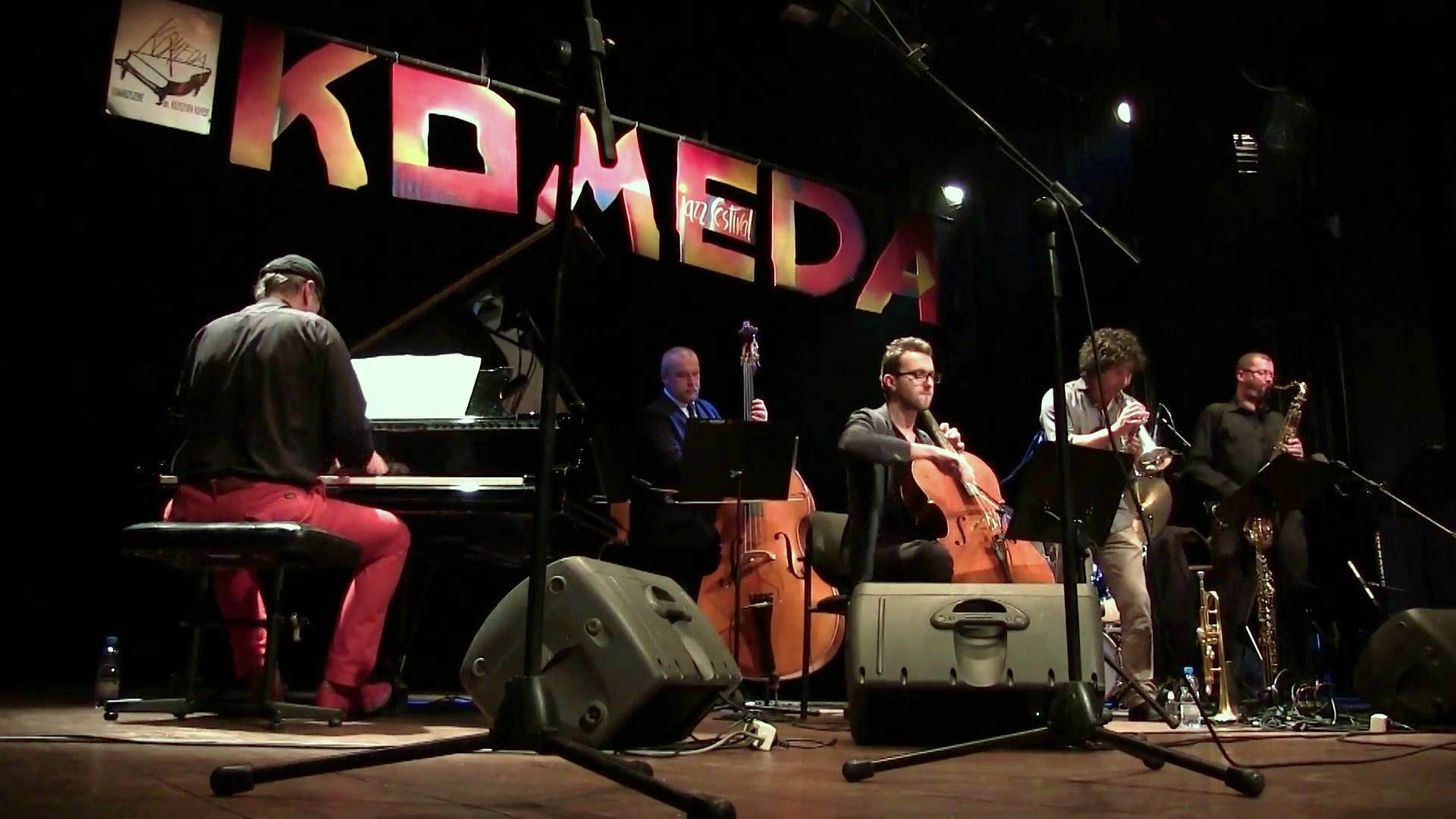
The Komeda Jazz Festival in 2014

The Komeda Jazz Festival and the Krzysztof Komeda Composers Competition has been held in Słupsk, Poland each November since 1995. The festival and the competition is dedicated to the memory of the Polish musician Krzysztof Komeda.

Leszek Kułakowski, jazz pianist and composer, is the initiator of this event and was also the first one to arrange Komeda's music for symphonic orchestra.
