= Aleksander Baumgardten =

Polish poet

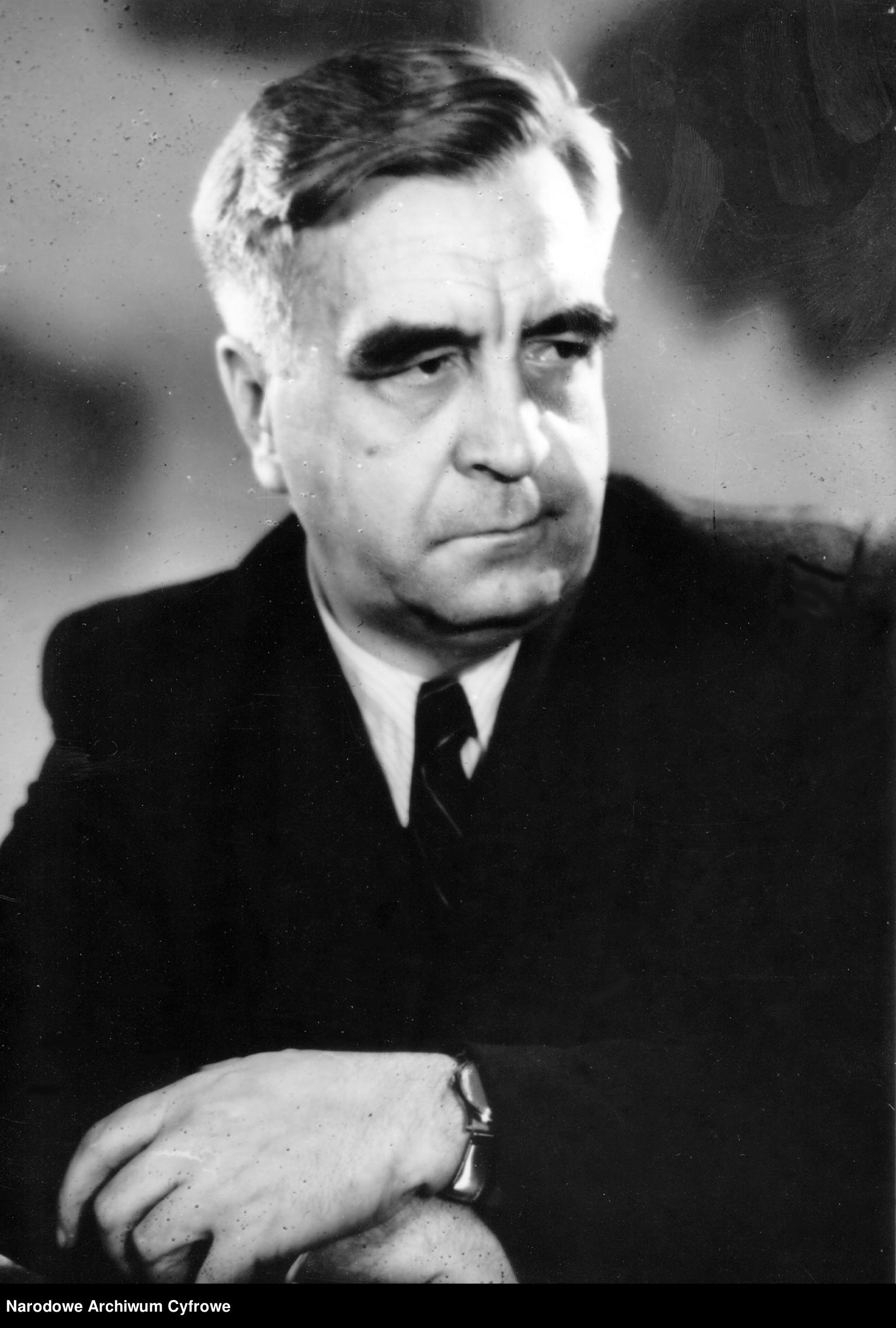

Aleksander Baumgardten (1908–1980) was a Polish poet.

Aleksander Baumgardten was born on May 31, 1908, in Kraków. He was a writer, known for Pięciu (1964). He died on June 29, 1980, in Katowice.
