= Five (1964 film) =

1964 film

Pięciu
- Directed by: Paweł Komorowski
- Written by: Aleksander Baumgardten
- Starring: Marian Kociniak
- Cinematography: Krzysztof Winiewicz
- Edited by: Zofia Dwornik
- Music by: Wojciech Kilar
- Release date: 2 December 1964
- Running time: 97 minutes
- Country: Poland
- Language: Polish

Pięciu ("Five") is a 1964 Polish drama film directed by Paweł Komorowski, and written by Aleksander Baumgardten.

== Cast ==
- Marian Kociniak as Kazio
- Andrzej Zaorski as Staszek
- Bogusław Sochnacki as Rysiek
- Ryszard Pietruski as Bernard Kalus
- Tadeusz Kalinowski as Wala
- Anna Ciepielewska as Wala's Wife Maryjka
- Magda Celówna as Rysiek's Sister Alka
- Helena Dąbrowska as Rysiek's Mother Helga
- Maria Kaniewska as Gerda Buchtowa
- Genowefa Korska
- Jolanta Umecka as Edyta Buchta
- Jerzy Nowak as Alfred Buchta
- Witold Pyrkosz as Alojz
