= Jerzy Milian =

Polish jazz musician, painter, and composer

- Birth name: Jerzy Stanisław Milian
- Born: April 10, 1935; Poznań, Poland
- Died: March 7, 2018 (aged 82); Katowice, Poland
- Genres: Jazz
- Occupation(s): Painter, composer, musician
- Instrument: Vibraphone

Jerzy Stanisław Milian (April 10, 1935 – March 7, 2018) was a Polish jazz musician, painter, composer and vibraphonist. At sixteen he graduated from the Secondary School of Music in Poznań. His teachers were Wolfram Heicking and Bogusław Schaeffer.

== Career ==
In the years 1953–1955, Milian formed a quintet with Stanisław Chwiłkowski, Ryszard Czaplicki, Jerzy Piątek and Stanisław Lisek. In the years 1956–1958, he played vibraphone in a sextet with Krzysztof Komeda, and at the turn of 1959 and 1960 in the quintet of Jan "Ptaszyn" Wróblewski. He was the director and artistic director of the Orchestra of Polish Radio and Television Services Entertainment in Katowice and lecturer at the Poznań Academy of Music. He participated in many jazz festivals, including the annual Jazz Jamboree in Warsaw.

He was a jury member at the XII Song Festival of Soviet in Zielona Góra in 1976.

== Personal life ==
In the years 1950–1957, he was a member of the ZMP. From 1961, he belonged to the Polish United Workers' Party. Awarded with the Knight's Cross of the Order of the Rebirth of Polish, Gold Cross of Merit and badge for distinguished cultural activists. He died on March 7, 2018, at the age of 82.

In 2004, he was awarded the Commander's Cross.

== Selected discography ==
=== Singles and EP ===
- Instrumental ensemble of Jerzy Milian (Pronit SP 440)
- 1961 Quintet Jorge Milian (Polskie Nagrania Muza N 0164)

=== Solo albums ===
- 1969 Dance music (Polish Recordings - Pronit XL, SXL 0791)
- 1969 Baazaar , Jerzy Milian Trio (Polskie Nagrania Muza)
- 1975 Jerzy Milian Amusement Polish Radio and Television Orchestra in Katowice (Polskie Nagrania Muza SX 1278)
- 1978 Orchestra of Polish Radio and Television in Katowice Amusement Conductor: Jerzy Milian (Polskie Nagrania Muza - Pronit SX 1543)
- 2003 Ashkhabad Girl (OBUH Records V23)
- 2005 Milianalia (OBUH Records V27, Polskie Nagrania Muza)
- 2012 'When Where Why' '(GAD Records CD 005)
- 2013 Blues for Prague (GAD Records CD 007)
- 2013 Stratus Nimbus (GAD Records CD 009)
- 2015 Semiramide (GAD Records CD 024)
- 2015 Milian 80 (GAD Records CD 026)
- 2016 Rivalen (GAD Records CD 037)

=== Albums with Jerzy Milian ===
- 1973 Jerzy Milian - Ballet Music and Film (Polskie Nagrania Muza SXL 0950)
