= Ssaki =

- Directed by: Roman Polański
- Written by: Roman Polański; Andrzej Kostenko
- Starring: Henryk Kluba; Michal Zolnierkiewicz
- Cinematography: Andrzej Kostenko
- Release date: 1962
- Running time: 10 minutes

Ssaki (English translation: Mammals) is a short film written and directed by Roman Polański in 1962. This was the last of Polański's short films before he began work on his first feature, Knife in the Water. Ssaki received awards at Oberhausen and Melbourne. It was shot in black and white, but most of the images are white because the action takes place in the snow. Accompanied by a whimsical film score and without any dialogue, it is reminiscent of the comedies from the silent film era. The story centers on two men and a sled. The clothes worn by both are appropriate for the wintry conditions, with one dressed more formally than the other. Both alternate pulling the other on the sled. The overriding dark metaphor of the 'story' is clear: both men would rather maintain their (alternately) power relationship than act together. Even after the sledge is gone, one has to carry the other on his back, and vice versa.
