= The Cats (1965 film) =

1965 film

- Directed by: Henning Carlsen
- Written by: Walentin Chorell
- Produced by: Lorens Marmstedt
- Starring: Eva Dahlbeck
- Cinematography: Mac Ahlberg
- Music by: Krzysztof Komeda
- Release date: 15 February 1965
- Running time: 91 minutes
- Country: Sweden
- Language: Swedish

The Cats (Swedish: Kattorna) is a 1965 Swedish drama film directed by Henning Carlsen. Eva Dahlbeck received the award for Best Actress at the 2nd Guldbagge Awards.

== Cast ==
- Eva Dahlbeck as Marta Alleus
- Gio Petré as Rike
- Monica Nielsen as Mirka
- Per Myrberg as Johnny
- Lena Granhagen as Ragni
- Hjördis Petterson as Anna
- Isa Quensel as Tora
- Ruth Kasdan as Xenia
- Inga Gill as Klara
- Lena Hansson as Sally
