= Henryk Kluba =

Film director and producer, actor, academic teacher (1931–2005)

- Born: 9 January 1931; Przystajń
- Died: 11 June 2005 (aged 74); Konin
- Occupations: Film director, actor, academic teacher

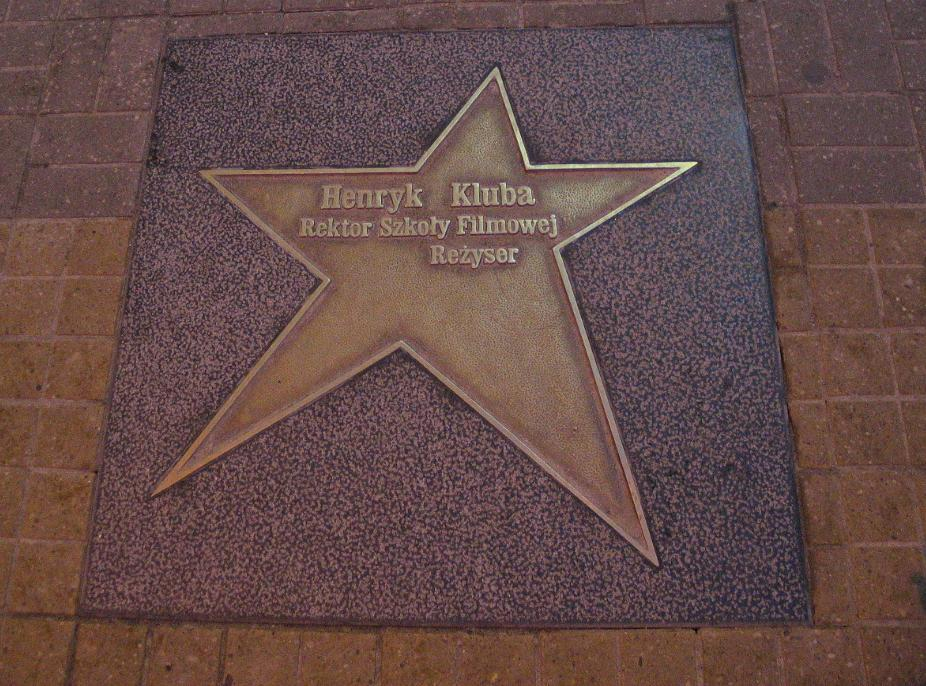
Henryk Kluba's star in Łódź

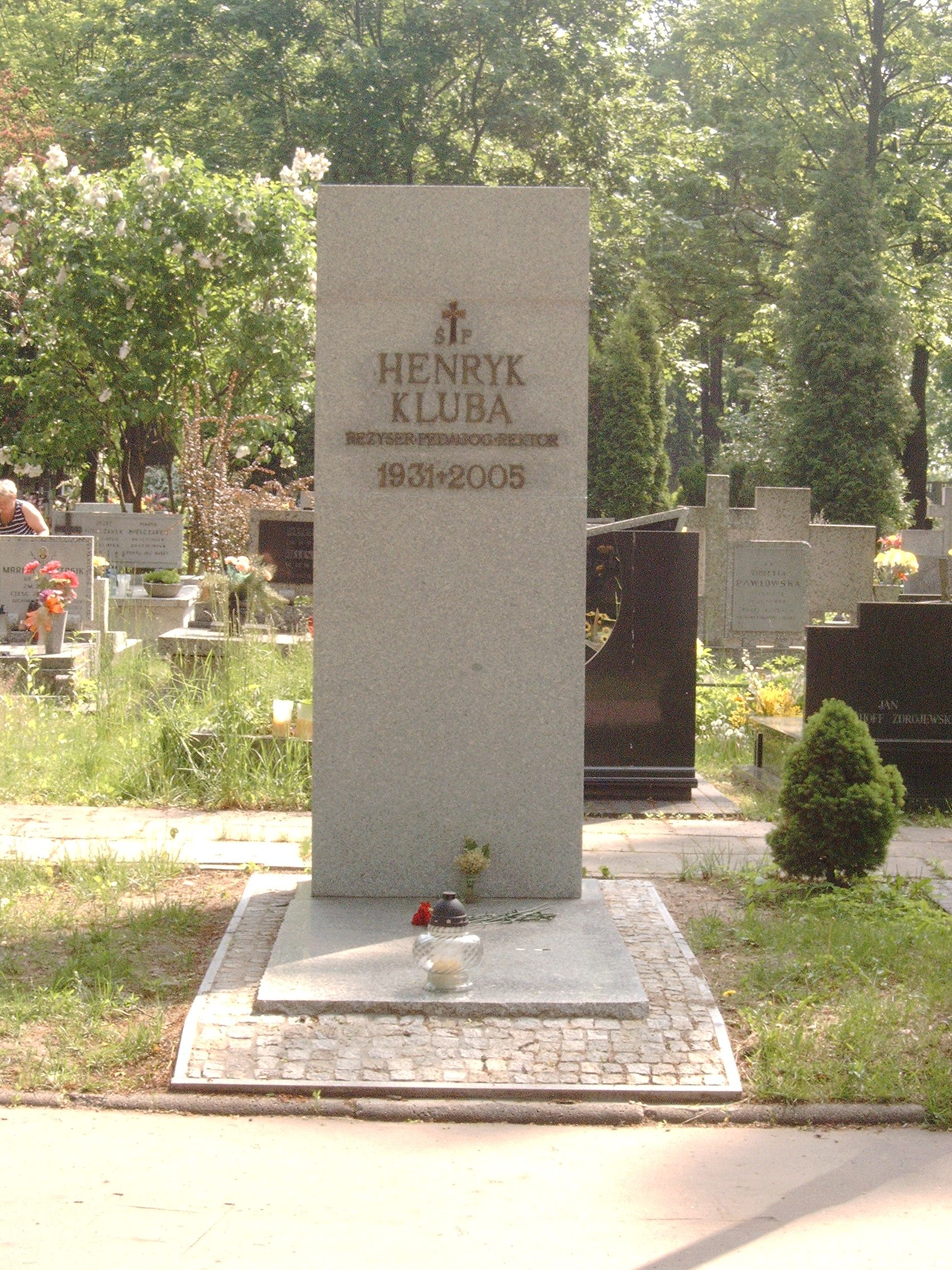
Henryk Kluba's grave at the Doły Municipal Cemetery in Łódź

Henryk Kluba (9 January 1931 – 11 June 2005) was a film director and producer, actor and academic teacher at the Łódź Film School.

== Biography ==
In 1951 he graduated from the Theatre School at the Adam Mickiewicz Theatre in Częstochowa. In 1952, he studied classical philology at the University of Wrocław. He graduated from the Łódź Film School in 1958, however he obtained diploma only in 1969.

From 1951 to 1956 he was a member of Union of Polish Youth. In 1978 he joined Polish United Workers' Party. In 1986, he became chairman of the Film Unit of the National Council for Culture. From 1987 to 1989, he was a member of the Cinematography Committee. He was dean of the Directing Department of the Łódź Film School from 1978 to 1981 and from 1993 to 1996. He was rector of the Łódź Film School in the years 1982–1990 and 1996–2002.

He was buried at the Avenue of the Distinguished at the Doły Municipal Cemetery in Łódź.

== Filmography ==
According to Filmpolski.pl:

=== As director ===
- Trzy protokoły (1956)
- W pracowni scenografa. Część I (1956)
- Ocalenie (1957)
- Proces (1957)
- Chudy i inni (1966)
- Słońce wschodzi raz na dzień (1967)
- Szkice warszawskie (1969)
- Doktor Ewa (1970)
- Pięć i pół bladego Józka (1971)
- Opowieść w czerwieni (1974)
- Sowizdrzał świętokrzyski (1978)
- Gwiazda Piołun (1988)

=== As actor ===
- Ewa chce spać (1957) as film director (not credited)
- Kalosze szczęścia (1958) as Sonia's client at the brothel
- Two Men and a Wardrobe (1958)
- When Angels Fall (1959)
- Tysiąc talarów (1959) as Jew/Szelest, the veal man at the psychiatric hospital (not credited)
- Ssaki (1962)
- Niezawodny sposób (1963)
- Zacne grzechy as sługa Krasnopolskiego (1963; not credited)
- Walkower (1965) as Rogal's coach
- Słońce wschodzi raz na dzień (1967) as a bishop
- Nie ma róży bez ognia as neighbour Boguś Poganek
- Zielona ziemia (1978) as gardener
- Urodziny młodego warszawiaka (1980)
- Filmówka (1996) as himself
- Ja jestem Jurek (2000) as impatient guest
- Eukaliptus (2001) as pastor

== Books ==
- Podstawy inscenizacji. Łódź. 2001.

== Awards ==
- Medal of the Commission of National Education (1978)
- Knight's Cross of the Order of Polonia Restituta (1983)
- Commander's Cross of the Order of Polonia Restituta (1988)
- Commander's Cross with Star of the Order of Polonia Restituta (1998)

== Commemoration ==
In 2007, a star with Henryk Kluba's name was placed on Piotrkowska Street in Łódź, in the Avenue of Stars.
