= Knife in the Water =

1962 Polish film by Roman Polanski

- Original Polish poster
- Directed by: Roman Polanski
- Screenplay by: Roman Polanski; Jakub Goldberg; Jerzy Skolimowski
- Produced by: Stanisław Zylewicz
- Starring: Leon Niemczyk; Jolanta Umecka; Zygmunt Malanowicz; Anna Ciepielewska; Roman Polanski
- Cinematography: Jerzy Lipman
- Edited by: Halina Prugar-Ketling
- Music by: Krzysztof T. Komeda
- Distributed by: Zespół Filmowy "Kamera"
- Release date: March 9, 1962 (United States)
- Running time: 94 minutes
- Country: Poland
- Language: Polish

Knife in the Water (Polish: Nóż w wodzie) is a 1962 Polish psychological thriller film (Note: Though some classify Knife in the Water as a drama due to its languid pace, it is more often described as a psychological thriller film. Film scholar Frank Bren describes the film in World Cinema: Poland (1986) as an "economic thriller." Film professor Charles Derry notes in The Suspense Thriller: Films in the Shadow of Alfred Hitchcock (2010) that, "although a suspense thriller, it has an art-house sensibility and almost no thrills whatsoever.") co-written and directed by Roman Polanski in his feature debut, and starring Leon Niemczyk, Jolanta Umecka, and Zygmunt Malanowicz. Its plot follows a husband and wife who are accompanied on a boating trip by a young male hitchhiker, who spurs a number of escalating confrontations between the couple.

The film was nominated for Academy Award for Best Foreign Language Film and is Polanski's only Polish-language feature to date. Knife in the Water has garnered acclaim from film critics since its release, and is one of Polanski's best-reviewed works. American filmmaker Martin Scorsese recognized the film as one of the masterpieces of Polish cinema and in 2014 selected it for screening alongside films such as Andrzej Wajda's Ashes and Diamonds and Innocent Sorcerers in the United States, Canada and United Kingdom as part of the Martin Scorsese Presents: Masterpieces of Polish Cinema festival of Polish films.

== Plot ==
Andrzej (Leon Niemczyk) and Krystyna (Jolanta Umecka) are driving to a lake to go sailing when they come upon a young man (Zygmunt Malanowicz) hitchhiking in the middle of the road. After nearly hitting him, Andrzej invites the young man along. When they arrive at the lake, instead of leaving the young man behind, Andrzej invites him to go sailing with them. The young man accepts the offer, and, not knowing much about sailing, must learn many hard lessons from Andrzej.

Meanwhile, tension gradually builds between Andrzej and the hitchhiker as they vie for the attentions of Krystyna. The title refers to the major turning point in the film when Andrzej taunts the young man with the latter's treasured pocket knife, which is accidentally lost overboard. A fight ensues between Andrzej and the hitchhiker, and the latter falls into the water. Andrzej and his wife search for him but cannot find him and assume that he has drowned since earlier he said that he could not swim. Andrzej and his wife quarrel about what to do, and Andrzej swims to shore to fetch the police. When the young man realizes that Andrzej has gone, he comes out from hiding behind a buoy on the lake and swims to the yacht. There he sees Krystyna naked, drying off. He boards the yacht, and Krystyna tells him he is as bad as Andrzej, but sexual attraction wins out and they have sex, off-screen.

Krystyna sails back to the dock, and the man jumps off and goes on his way before Andrzej appears and takes charge again. He wants to go to the police to report the young man missing. Krystyna tells him that the young man returned and she was unfaithful. Andrzej does not know what to believe, and at the road junction, where they would turn one way to return home and another to go to the police station, the car does not move.

== Cast ==
- Leon Niemczyk as Andrzej
- Jolanta Umecka as Krystyna (dubbed by Anna Ciepielewska)
- Zygmunt Malanowicz as Young Man (dubbed by Roman Polanski)

== Analysis ==
Film professor Charles Derry notes that Knife in the Water is atypical from other thrillers due to the fact that it "represses the usual violence promised by the thriller, [and] it ends its narrative with violence's opposite: a scene of total stasis, in which no action is perfectly acceptable to the husband protagonist."

== Production ==
=== Development ===
The screenplay for the film, written by Polanski, Jakub Goldberg, and Jerzy Skolimowski, was initially rejected by the Polish Ministry of Culture due to its "lack of social commitment." Unable to obtain funding in his native Poland, Polanski reworked the screenplay to be set in France, though the production was ultimately unable to receive funding there as well. After making a number of minor edits to the screenplay—mainly snippets of dialogue demonstrating "social commitment" to "appease the Ministry [of Culture]"—Polanski again pitched the project to the national film board, who approved it for production.

=== Filming ===
Knife in the Water was shot by Polanski in 1961 using only three actors. Two of the actors (Jolanta Umecka, who plays Krystyna and Zygmunt Malanowicz, who plays the young man) had virtually no previous professional acting experience.

Being filmed on the water (in the Polish Masurian Lake District), and largely within the confines of a sailboat and life raft, the film was technically difficult. While the sailboat was large enough for the three actors, it was quite cramped for the film crew, who often had to hang over the side of the boat with safety harnesses in order to shoot.

=== Music ===
Krzysztof Komeda composed the film's music and the featured saxophonist was Bernt Rosengren.

== Release ==
Knife in the Water was released theatrically in Poland on 9 March 1962. It premiered in the United States the following year, on 28 October 1963.

=== Critical reception ===
Knife in the Water was nominated for Best Foreign Language Film at the 1963 Academy Awards, the first Polish motion picture to receive this kind of recognition. Time used a still from the film, with Umecka and Malanowicz on the verge of a kiss, as the cover of an issue featuring international cinema. It won the FIPRESCI Prize in 1962 Venice Film Festival. The film has been included in lists of the best debut feature films and was ranked number 61 in Empire magazine's "The 100 Best Films of World Cinema" in 2010.

On review aggregator Rotten Tomatoes, the film has a 97% approval rating based on 34 reviews, with an average score of 8.3/10.

In 2014, Martin Scorsese selected Knife in the Water to be screened as part of the festival of Polish films in the United States and Canada entitled "Martin Scorsese Presents: Masterpieces of Polish Cinema".

In the 2015 poll conducted by Polish Museum of Cinematography in Łódź, Knife in the Water was ranked as the fourth greatest Polish film of all time.

=== Home media ===
Knife in the Water was released on VHS in 1996, and on DVD in 2003 by The Criterion Collection.

== Related works ==
Knife in the Water was the basis for a low budget 2001 American film Kaaterskill Falls, set in the Catskill Mountains.

Polański himself was offered to make an English-language, colour remake, with a Hollywood cast (including Henry Fonda), but he refused, saying he did not want to do a remake of a movie that was already good.

== See also ==
- List of submissions to the 36th Academy Awards for Best Foreign Language Film
- List of Polish submissions for the Academy Award for Best Foreign Language Film

== Sources ==
- Bren, Frank (1986). World Cinema: Poland. London, England: Flicks Books. ISBN 978-0-948-91146-0.
- Caputo, Davide (2012). Polanski and Perception: The Psychology of Seeing and the Cinema of Roman Polanski. Bristol, England: Intellect Books. ISBN 978-1-841-50552-7.
- Derry, Charles (2010). The Suspense Thriller: Films in the Shadow of Alfred Hitchcock. Jefferson, North Carolina: McFarland. ISBN 978-0-786-46240-7.
- Sanders, Ed (2016). Sharon Tate: A Life. New York City, New York: Da Capo Press. ISBN 978-0-306-82240-7.
- Spencer, Kristopher (2014). Film and Television Scores, 1950-1979: A Critical Survey by Genre. Jefferson, North Carolina: McFarland. ISBN 978-0-786-45228-6.
