= When Angels Fall =

- Directed by: Roman Polański
- Written by: Roman Polański
- Starring: Barbara Lass; Roman Polański; Henryk Kluba; Andrzej Kondratiuk
- Cinematography: Henryk Kucharski
- Music by: Krzysztof Komeda
- Release date: 1959
- Running time: 21 minutes
- Country: Poland

When Angels Fall (Polish: Gdy spadają anioły) is a short film written and directed by Roman Polanski in 1959. The idea for the film was taken from a short story Klozet Babcia (Toilet Granny), written by Leszek Szymański and published in the weekly Kierunki in Warsaw, Poland. The film was Polanski's first produced in color.

The film, told mostly in flashback, portrays a washroom attendant who reminisces about her former life while daydreaming at her dreary job.
