= Roman Polanski =

Polish and French filmmaker (born 1933)

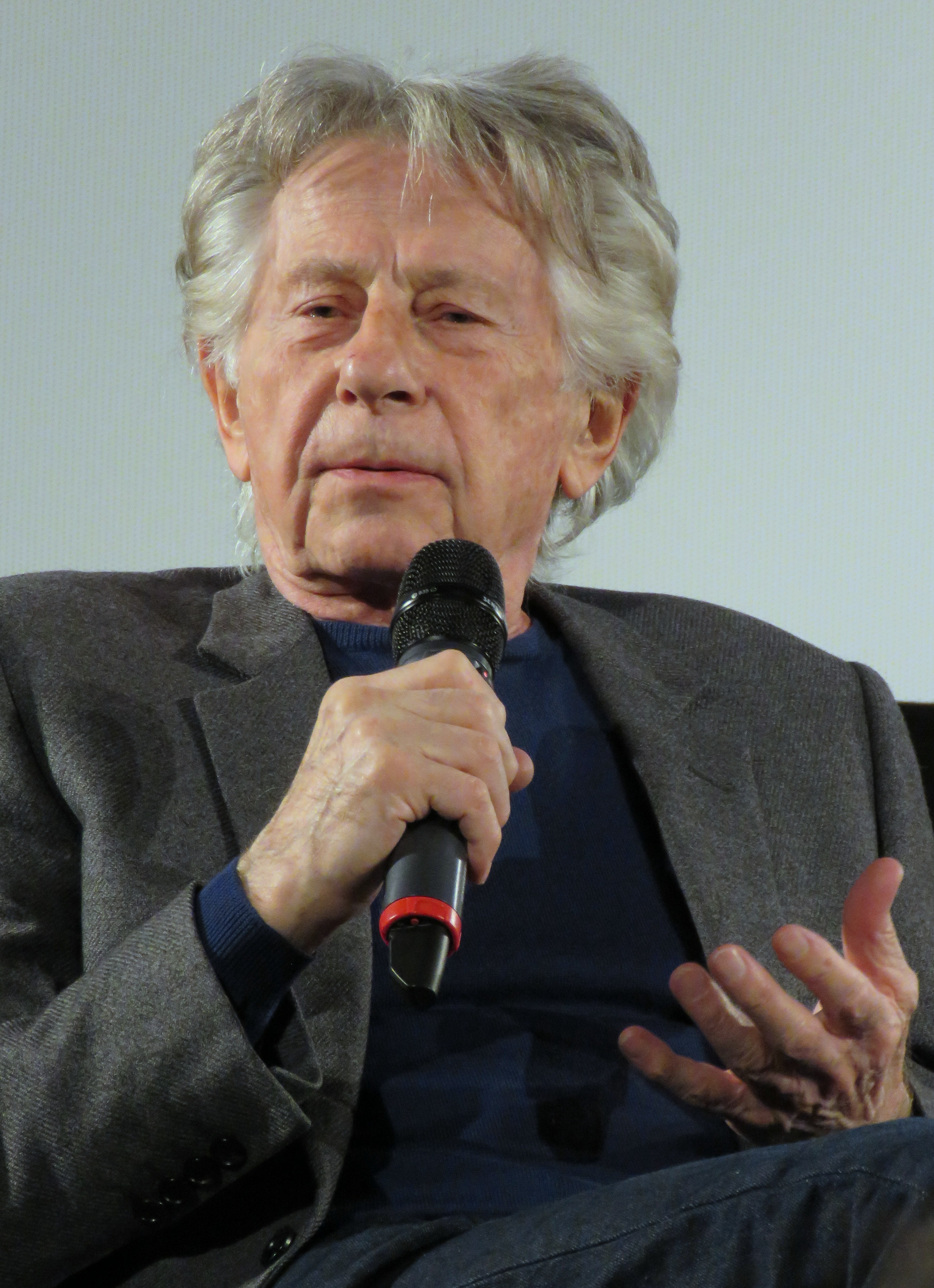
- Polanski in 2023
- Born: Raymond Roman Thierry Liebling; 18 August 1933 (age 93); Paris, France
- Citizenship: Poland; France
- Education: Łódź Film School
- Occupations: Film director; producer; screenwriter; actor
- Years active: 1953–present
- Spouses: Barbara Kwiatkowska-Lass (m. 1959; div. 1962) Sharon Tate (m. 1968; died 1969) Emmanuelle Seigner (m. 1989)
- Partner: Nastassja Kinski (1976–1979) (Note: Polanski confirmed this relationship in a 1994 interview with Diane Sawyer. Despite this Kinski has denied the relationship.)
- Children: 3, (Note: Including deceased unborn son with Sharon Tate.) including Morgane
- Criminal information
- Status: Fugitive (California)
- Conviction: Unlawful sexual intercourse with a minor

Signature
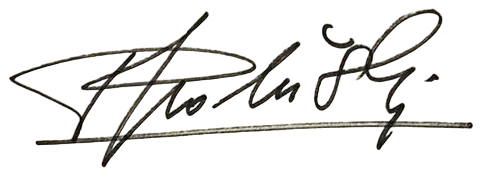

Raymond Roman Thierry Polański (Note: /pəˈlænski/ pə-LAN-skee; Polish: [ˈrɔman pɔˈlaj̃skʲi]; French: [ʁɛmɔ̃ ʁɔmɑ̃ tjɛʁi pɔlɑ̃ski].) (né Liebling; born 18 August 1933) is a Polish and French filmmaker and actor. He is the recipient of numerous accolades, including an Academy Award, three British Academy Film Awards, ten César Awards, and two Golden Globe Awards as well as a Golden Bear and a Palme d'Or.

In 1977, Polanski was arrested in the United States for drugging and raping a 13-year-old girl. He pleaded guilty to the lesser charge of unlawful sex with a minor in exchange for a probation-only sentence. The night before his sentencing hearing in 1978, he learned that the judge would likely reject the proffered plea bargain, so he fled the U.S. to Europe, where he continued his career. He remains a fugitive from the U.S. justice system. Subsequently, allegations of abuse have been made by several women.

Polanski's parents moved the family from his birthplace in Paris back to Kraków in 1937. Two years later, the invasion of Poland by Nazi Germany started World War II, and the family found themselves trapped in the Kraków Ghetto. After his mother and father were taken in raids, Polanski spent his formative years in foster homes, surviving the Holocaust by adopting a false identity and concealing his half Jewish heritage. In 1969, Polanski's pregnant wife, actress Sharon Tate, was murdered, along with four friends, by members of the Manson Family in an internationally notorious case.

Polanski's first feature-length film, Knife in the Water (1962), made in Poland, was nominated for the United States Academy Award for Best Foreign Language Film. A few years later he first left for France and then moved to the United Kingdom, where he directed his first three English-language feature-length films: Repulsion (1965), Cul-de-sac (1966), and The Fearless Vampire Killers (1967). In 1968, he settled in the United States and cemented his status in the film industry by directing the horror film Rosemary's Baby (1968). He made Macbeth (1971) in England and Chinatown (1974) back in Hollywood. His other critically acclaimed films include The Tenant (1976), Tess (1979), Death and the Maiden (1994), The Pianist (2002) which won him the Academy Award for Best Director, The Ghost Writer (2010), Venus in Fur (2013), and An Officer and a Spy (2019). Polanski has made 23 feature films to date. He has also starred in several Polish films as well as in his own films.

== Early life ==
Roman Polanski was born on 18 August 1933, in interbellum Paris. He was the son of Bula (aka "Bella") Katz-Przedborska and Mojżesz (or Maurycy) Liebling (later Polański), a painter and manufacturer of sculptures, who after World War II was known as Ryszard Polański. Polanski's father was Jewish and originally from Poland. Polanski's mother was born in Russia. Her own father was Jewish and mother was a Gentile, but Bula had been raised in the Catholic faith. She had a daughter, Annette, by her previous husband. Annette survived Auschwitz, where her mother was murdered, and left Poland forever for France. Polanski's parents were both agnostics. Polanski has stated that he is an atheist.

=== World War II and the Holocaust ===
The Polański family moved back to Kraków, Poland, in early 1937, and were living there when World War II began with the invasion of Poland. Kraków was soon occupied by the German forces, and the racist and anti-Semitic Nuremberg Laws made the Polańskis targets of persecution, forcing them into the Kraków Ghetto, along with thousands of the city's Jews. Around the age of six, Polanski attended primary school for only a few weeks, until "all the Jewish children were abruptly expelled", writes biographer Christopher Sandford. That initiative was soon followed by the requirement that all Jewish children over the age of twelve wear white armbands, with a blue Star of David imprinted, for visual identification. After he was expelled, Polanski was not allowed to enter another classroom for six years.

Polanski's father was transferred, along with thousands of other Jews, to Mauthausen, a group of 49 German concentration camps in Austria. His mother, who was four months pregnant at the time, was taken to Auschwitz and killed in the gas chamber soon after arriving. The forced exodus took place immediately after the German liquidation of the Warsaw Ghetto, as portrayed in Polanski's 2002 film The Pianist. Polanski, who was then hiding from the Germans, saw his father being marched off with a long line of people. Polanski tried getting closer to his father to ask him what was happening and got within a few yards. His father saw him, but afraid his son might be spotted by the German soldiers, whispered (in Polish), "Get lost!"

Polanski escaped the Kraków Ghetto in 1943 and survived with the help of some Polish Roman Catholics, including a woman who had promised Polanski's father that she would shelter the boy. Polanski attended church, learned to recite Catholic prayers by heart, and behaved outwardly as a Roman Catholic, although he was never baptized. His efforts to blend into a Catholic household failed miserably at least once, when the parish priest visiting the family posed questions to him one-on-one about the catechism, and ultimately said, "You aren't one of us". The punishment for helping a Jew in German-occupied Poland was death.

As Polanski roamed the countryside trying to survive in a Poland now occupied by German troops, he witnessed many horrors, such as being "forced to take part in a cruel and sadistic game in which German soldiers took shots at him for target practice". The author Ian Freer concludes that Polanski's constant childhood fears and dread of violence have contributed to the "tangible atmospheres he conjures up on film". By the time the war ended in 1945, a fifth of the Polish population had been killed, the vast majority being civilians. Of those deaths, 3 million were Polish Jews, which accounted for 90% of the country's Jewish population. According to Sandford, Polanski used the memory of his mother, her dress and makeup style, as a physical model for Faye Dunaway's character in his film Chinatown (1974).

In October 2020, Polanski went back to Poland and paid respects to a Polish couple who helped him hide and escape the Nazis. Stefania and Jan Buchala were recognized by Yad Vashem, Israel's Holocaust memorial, as Righteous Among the Nations. Polanski recalled Stefania Buchala as being an "extremely noble" and courageous person.

=== After the war ===
After the war, Polanski was reunited with his father and moved back to Kraków. His father remarried on 21 December 1946 to Wanda Zajączkowska (whom Polanski had never liked) and died of cancer in 1984. Time repaired the family contacts; Polanski visited them in Kraków, and relatives visited him in Hollywood and Paris. Polanski recalls the villages and families he lived with as relatively primitive by European standards:

They were really simple Catholic peasants. This Polish village was like the English village in Tess. Very primitive. No electricity. The kids with whom I lived didn't know about electricity ... they wouldn't believe me when I told them it was enough to turn on a switch!

Polanski stated that "you must live in a Communist country to really understand how bad it can be. Then you will appreciate capitalism." He also remembered events at the war's end and his reintroduction to mainstream society when he was 12, forming friendships with other children, such as Roma Ligocka, Ryszard Horowitz and his family.

=== Introduction to movies ===
Polanski's fascination with cinema began very early when he was around age four or five. He recalls this period in an interview:

Even as a child, I always loved cinema and was thrilled when my parents would take me before the war. Then we were put into the ghetto in Krakòw and there was no cinema, but the Germans often showed newsreels to the people outside the ghetto, on a screen in the market place. And there was one particular corner where you could see the screen through the barbed wire. I remember watching with fascination, although all they were showing was the German army and German tanks, with occasional anti-Jewish slogans inserted on cards.

After the war, Polanski watched films, either at school or at a local cinema, using whatever pocket money he had. Polanski writes, "Most of this went on the movies, but movie seats were dirt cheap, so a little went a long way. I lapped up every kind of film." As time went on, movies became more than an escape into entertainment, as he explains:

Movies were becoming an absolute obsession with me. I was enthralled by everything connected with the cinema—not just the movies themselves but the aura that surrounded them. I loved the luminous rectangle of the screen, the sight of the beam slicing through the darkness from the projection booth, the miraculous synchronization of sound and vision, even the dusty smell of the tip-up seats. More than anything else though, I was fascinated by the actual mechanics of the process.

Polanski was above all influenced by Carol Reed's Odd Man Out (1947) – "I still consider it as one of the best movies I've ever seen and a film which made me want to pursue this career more than anything else ... I always dreamt of doing things of this sort or that style. To a certain extent I must say that I somehow perpetuate the ideas of that movie in what I do."

== Early career in Poland ==
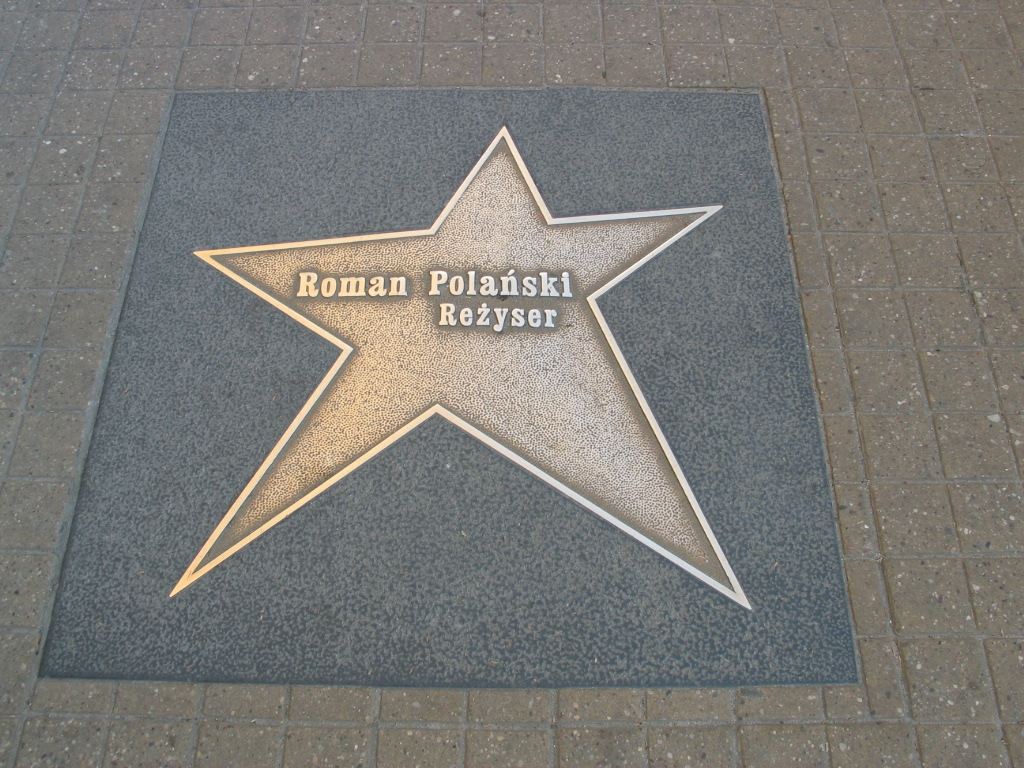
Polanski's star on the Łódź walk of fame

Polanski graduated from the National Film School in Łódź, the third-largest city in Poland. In the 1950s, Polanski took up acting, appearing in Andrzej Wajda's Pokolenie (A Generation, 1954) and in the same year in Silik Sternfeld's Zaczarowany rower (Enchanted Bicycle or Magical Bicycle). Polanski's directorial debut was also in 1955 with a short film, Rower (Bicycle). Rower is a semi-autobiographical feature film, believed to be lost, which also starred Polanski. It refers to his real-life violent altercation with a notorious Kraków felon, Janusz Dziuba, who arranged to sell Polanski a bicycle, but instead beat him badly and stole his money. In real life, the offender was arrested while fleeing after fracturing Polanski's skull, and executed for three murders, out of eight prior such assaults which he had committed. Several other short films made during his study at Łódź gained him considerable recognition, particularly Two Men and a Wardrobe (1958) and When Angels Fall (1959). He graduated in 1959.

== Film director ==
=== 1962–1976: Breakthrough and stardom ===
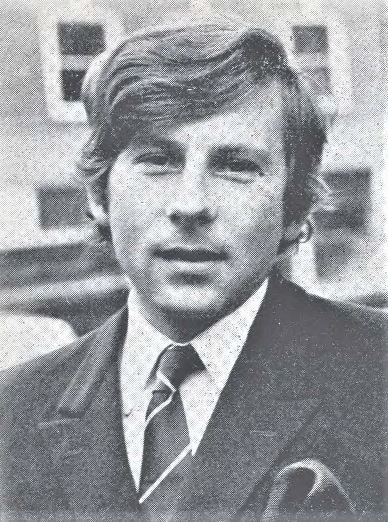
Polanski in 1969

==== Knife in the Water (1962) ====
Polanski's first feature-length film, Knife in the Water, was also one of the first significant Polish films after the Second World War that did not have a war theme. Scripted by Jerzy Skolimowski, Jakub Goldberg, and Polanski, Knife in the Water is about a wealthy, unhappily married couple who decide to take a mysterious hitchhiker with them on a weekend boating excursion. Knife in the Water was a major commercial success in the West and gave Polanski an international reputation. The film also earned its director his first Academy Award nomination (Best Foreign Language Film) in 1963. Leon Niemczyk, who played Andrzej, was the only professional actor in the film. Jolanta Umecka, who played Krystyna, was discovered by Polanski at a swimming pool.

Polanski left then-communist Poland and moved to France, where he had already made two notable short films in 1961: The Fat and the Lean and Mammals. While in France, Polanski contributed one segment ("La rivière de diamants") to the French-produced omnibus film, Les plus belles escroqueries du monde (English title: The Beautiful Swindlers) in 1964. (He has since had the segment removed from all releases of the film.) However, Polanski found that in the early 1960s, the French film industry was xenophobic and generally unwilling to support a rising filmmaker of foreign origin.

==== Repulsion (1965) ====
Polanski made three feature films in England, based on original scripts written by himself and Gérard Brach, a frequent collaborator. Repulsion (1965) is a psychological horror film focusing on a young Belgian woman named Carol (Catherine Deneuve).

The film's themes, situations, visual motifs, and effects clearly reflect the influence of early surrealist cinema as well as horror movies of the 1950s—particularly Luis Buñuel's Un chien Andalou, Jean Cocteau's The Blood of a Poet, Henri-Georges Clouzot's Diabolique and Alfred Hitchcock's Psycho.

==== Cul-de-sac (1966) ====
Cul-de-sac (1966) is a bleak nihilist tragicomedy filmed on location in Northumberland. The tone and premise of the film owe a great deal to Samuel Beckett's Waiting for Godot, along with aspects of Harold Pinter's The Birthday Party.

In 1966 Polanski co-produced the short film G.G. Passion, directed by David Bailey.

==== The Fearless Vampire Killers/Dance of the Vampires (1967) ====
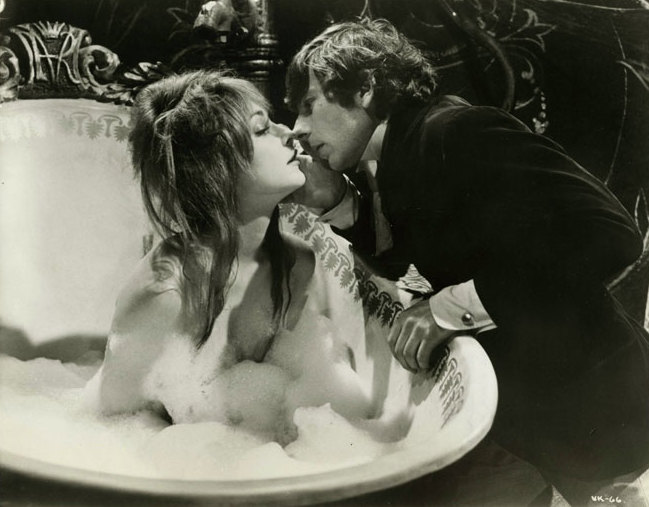
Roman Polanski with Sharon Tate in "The Fearless Vampire Killers", 1967

The Fearless Vampire Killers (1967) (known by its original title, "Dance of the Vampires" in most countries outside the United States) is a parody of vampire films. The plot concerns a buffoonish professor and his clumsy assistant, Alfred (played by Polanski), who are traveling through Transylvania in search of vampires. The Fearless Vampire Killers was Polanski's first feature to be photographed in color with the use of Panavision lenses, and included a striking visual style with snow-covered, fairy-tale landscapes, similar to the work of Soviet fantasy filmmakers. In addition, the richly textured color schemes of the settings evoke the paintings of the Belarusian-Jewish artist Marc Chagall, who provides the namesake for the innkeeper in the film. The film was written for Jack MacGowran, who played the lead role of Professor Abronsius.

Polanski met Sharon Tate while making the film; she played the role of the local innkeeper's daughter. They were married in London on 20 January 1968. Shortly after they married, Polanski, with Tate at his side during a documentary film, described the demands of young movie viewers who he said always wanted to see something "new" and "different".

==== Rosemary's Baby (1968) ====
Paramount Pictures's studio head Robert Evans brought Polanski to America ostensibly to direct the film Downhill Racer, but told Polanski that he really wanted him to read the horror novel Rosemary's Baby by Ira Levin to see if a film could be made out of it. Polanski read it non-stop through the night and the following morning decided he wanted to write as well as direct it. He wrote the 272-page screenplay in just over three weeks. The film, Rosemary's Baby (1968), was a box-office success and became his first Hollywood production, thereby establishing his reputation as a major commercial filmmaker. The film, a horror-thriller set in trendy Manhattan, is about Rosemary Woodhouse (Mia Farrow), a young housewife who is impregnated by the devil. Polanski's screenplay adaptation earned him a second Academy Award nomination.

On 9 August 1969, while Polanski was working in London, his pregnant wife, Sharon Tate, and four other people were murdered at the Polanskis' residence in Los Angeles by cult leader Charles Manson's followers.

==== Macbeth (1971) ====
Polanski adapted Macbeth into a screenplay with the Shakespeare expert Kenneth Tynan. Jon Finch and Francesca Annis played the main characters. Hugh Hefner and Playboy Productions funded the 1971 film, which opened in New York and was screened in Playboy Theater. Hefner was credited as executive producer, and the film was listed as a "Playboy Production". It was controversial because of Lady Macbeth's being nude in a scene, and received an X rating because of its graphic violence and nudity. In his autobiography, Polanski wrote that he wanted to be true to the violent nature of the work and that he had been aware that his first project following Tate's murder would be subject to scrutiny and probable criticism regardless of the subject matter; if he had made a comedy he would have been perceived as callous.

==== What? (1972) ====
Written by Polanski and previous collaborator Gérard Brach, What? (1972) is a mordant absurdist comedy loosely based on the themes of Alice in Wonderland and Henry James. The film is a rambling shaggy dog story about the sexual indignities that befall a winsome young American hippie woman hitchhiking through Europe.

==== Chinatown (1974) ====
Polanski was an outstanding director. There was no question, after three days seeing him operate, that here was a really top talent.

— Co-star John Huston

Polanski returned to Hollywood in 1973 to direct Chinatown (1974) for Paramount Pictures. The film is widely considered to be one of the finest American mystery crime movies, inspired by the real-life California Water Wars, a series of disputes over southern California water at the beginning of the 20th century.

It was nominated for 11 Academy Awards, including those for actors Jack Nicholson and Faye Dunaway. Robert Towne won for Best Original Screenplay. It also had actor-director John Huston in a supporting role, and was the last film Polanski directed in the United States. In 1991, the film was selected by the Library of Congress for preservation in the United States National Film Registry as being "culturally, historically or aesthetically significant" and it is frequently listed as among the best in world cinema.

==== The Tenant (1976) ====
Polanski returned to Paris for his next film, The Tenant (1976), which was based on a 1964 novel by Roland Topor, a French writer of Polish-Jewish origin. In addition to directing the film, Polanski also played a leading role of a timid Polish immigrant living in Paris. Together with Repulsion and Rosemary's Baby, The Tenant can be seen as the third installment in a loose trilogy of films called the "Apartment Trilogy" that explores the themes of social alienation and psychic and emotional breakdown.

In 1978, Polanski became a fugitive from American justice and could no longer work in countries where he might face arrest or extradition.

=== 1979–2004 ===
==== Tess (1979) ====
He dedicated his next film, Tess (1979), to the memory of his late wife, Sharon Tate. It was Tate who first suggested he read Tess of the d'Urbervilles, which she thought would make a good film; he subsequently expected her to star in it. Nearly a decade after Tate's death, he met Nastassja Kinski, a model and aspiring young actress who had already been in a number of European films. He offered her the starring role, which she accepted. Her father was Klaus Kinski, a leading German actor, who had introduced her to films.

Because the role required having a local dialect, Polanski sent her to London for five months of study and to spend time in the Dorset countryside to get a flavor of the region. In the film, Kinski starred opposite Peter Firth and Leigh Lawson.

[Polanski] took a lot of time, two years, preparing me for that film. ... He was strict with me, but in a good way. He made me feel smart, that I could do things.

— Nastassja Kinski

Tess was shot in the north of France instead of Hardy's England and became the most expensive film made in France up to that time. Ultimately, it proved a financial success and was well received by both critics and the public. Polanski won France's César Awards for Best Picture and Best Director and received his fourth Academy Award nomination (and his second nomination for Best Director). The film received three Oscars: best cinematography, best art direction, best costume design, and was nominated for best picture.

At the time, there were rumors that Polanski and Kinski became romantically involved, which he confirmed in a 1994 interview with Diane Sawyer, but Nastassja says the rumors are untrue; they were never lovers or had an affair. She admits that "there was a flirtation. There could have been a seduction, but there was not. He had respect for me." She also recalls his influence on her while filming: "He was really a gentleman, not at all like the things I had heard. He introduced me to beautiful books, plays, movies. He educated me." On an emotional level, she said years later that "he was one of the people in my life who cared, ... who took me seriously and gave me a lot of strength". She told David Letterman more about her experience working with Polanski during an interview.

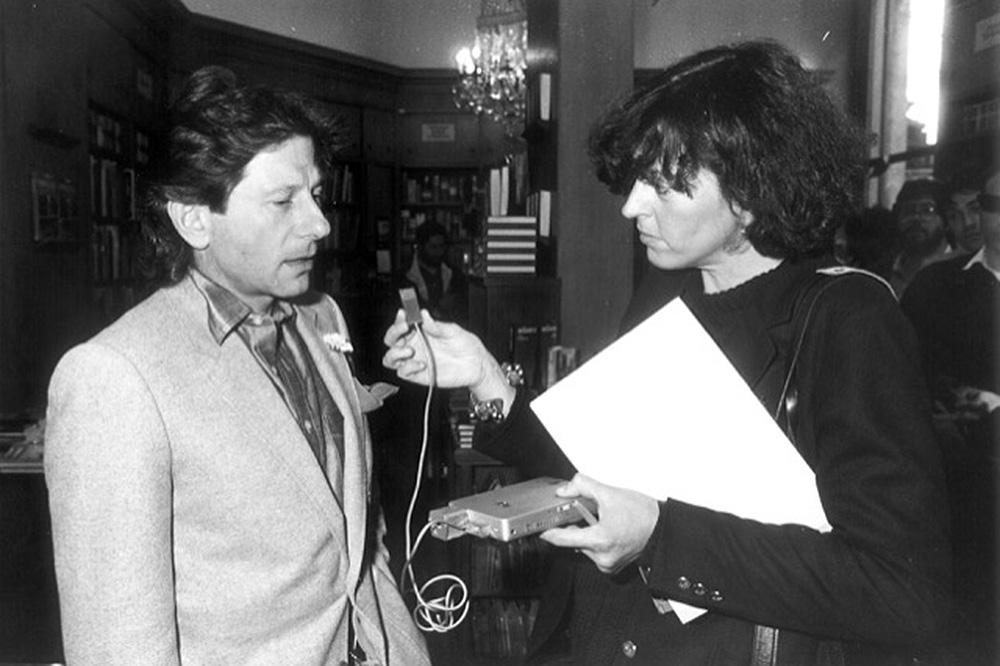
Polanski in Italy in 1984

In 1981, Polanski directed and co-starred (as Mozart) in a stage production of Peter Shaffer's play Amadeus, first in Warsaw, then in Paris. The play was again directed by Polanski, in Milan, in 1999.

==== Pirates (1986) ====
Nearly seven years passed before Polanski's next film, Pirates, a lavish period piece starring Walter Matthau as Captain Red, which the director intended as an homage to the beloved Errol Flynn swashbucklers of his childhood. Captain Red's henchman, Jean Baptiste, was played by Cris Campion. The film is about a rebellion the two led on a ship called the Neptune, in the seventeenth century. The screenplay was written by Polanski, Gérard Brach, and John Brownjohn. The film was shot on location in Tunisia, using a full-sized pirate vessel constructed for the production. It was a financial and critical failure, recovering a small fraction of its production budget and garnering a single Academy Award nomination.

==== Frantic (1988) ====
Frantic (1988) was a Hitchcockian suspense-thriller starring Harrison Ford and the actress/model Emmanuelle Seigner, who later became Polanski's wife. The film follows an ordinary tourist in Paris whose wife is kidnapped. He attempts, hopelessly, to go through the Byzantine bureaucratic channels to deal with her disappearance, but finally takes matters into his own hands. The film was a commercial failure but received positive reviews from critics.

==== Bitter Moon (1992) ====
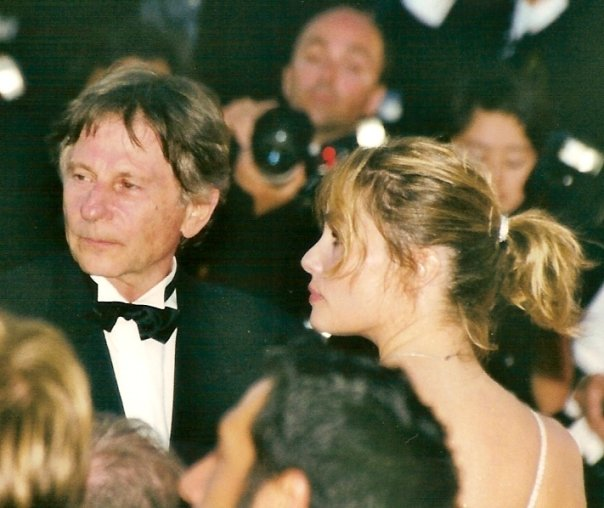
Polanski with wife Emmanuelle Seigner at the 1992 Cannes Film Festival

In 1992 Polanski followed with the dark psycho-sexual film Bitter Moon. The film starred Seigner, Hugh Grant, and Kristin Scott Thomas. Film critic Janet Maslin of The New York Times wrote, "Whatever else Mr. Polanski may be – nasty, mocking, darkly subversive in his view of the world – he definitely isn't dull. Bitter Moon is the kind of world-class, defiantly bad film that has a life of its own."

==== Death and the Maiden (1994) ====
In 1994 Polanski directed a film of the acclaimed play Death and the Maiden starring Ben Kingsley and Sigourney Weaver. The film is based on the Ariel Dorfman play of the same name. Roger Ebert of the Chicago Sun-Times praised Polanski on his directing writing, "Death and the Maiden is all about acting. In other hands, even given the same director, this might have been a dreary slog."

==== The Fearless Vampire Killers (1997) ====
In 1997, Polanski directed a stage version of his 1967 film The Fearless Vampire Killers, which debuted in Vienna followed by successful runs in Stuttgart, Hamburg, Berlin, and Budapest.

On 11 March 1998, Polanski was elected a member of the Académie des Beaux-Arts.

==== The Ninth Gate (1999) ====
The Ninth Gate is a thriller based on the novel El Club Dumas by Arturo Perez-Reverte and starring Johnny Depp. The movie's plot is based on the idea that an ancient text called "The Nine Gates of the Kingdom of Shadows", authored by Aristide Torchia along with Lucifer, is the key to raising Satan.

==== The Pianist (2002) ====
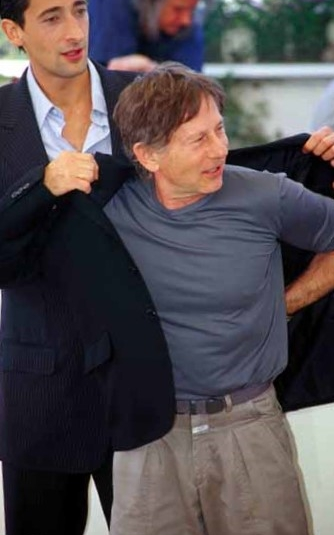
Polanski at the 2002 Cannes Film Festival for The Pianist

In 2001, Polanski filmed The Pianist, an adaptation of the World War II autobiography of the same name by Polish-Jewish musician Władysław Szpilman. Szpilman's experiences as a persecuted Jew in Poland during World War II were reminiscent of those of Polanski and his family. While Szpilman and Polanski escaped the concentration camps, their families did not, eventually perishing.

When Warsaw, Poland, was chosen for the 2002 premiere of The Pianist, "the country exploded with pride". According to reports, numerous former communists came to the screening and "agreed that it was a fantastic film". In May 2002, the film won the Palme d'Or (Golden Palm) award at the Cannes Film Festival, as well as Césars for Best Film and Best Director.

The film was released in North America to critical acclaim. Roger Ebert praised in particular Polanski, writing: "[His] direction is masterful" and added "Polanski is reflecting, I believe, his own deepest feelings: that he survived, but need not have, and that his mother died and left a wound that had never healed." Polanski later won the 2002 Academy Award for Best Director. Because Polanski would have been arrested in the United States, he did not attend the Academy Awards ceremony in Hollywood. After the announcement of the Best Director Award, Polanski received a standing ovation from most of those present in the theater, which has received criticism since the ceremony. Actor Harrison Ford accepted the award for Polanski and then presented the Oscar to him at the Deauville Film Festival five months later in a public ceremony. Polanski later received the Crystal Globe award for outstanding artistic contribution to world cinema at the Karlovy Vary International Film Festival in 2004.

=== 2005–present ===
==== Oliver Twist (2005) ====
Oliver Twist is an adaptation of Charles Dickens' novel, written by The Pianist's Ronald Harwood and shot in Prague. Polanski said in interviews that he made the film as something he could show his children and that the life of the young scavenger mirrored his own life, fending for himself in World War II Poland.

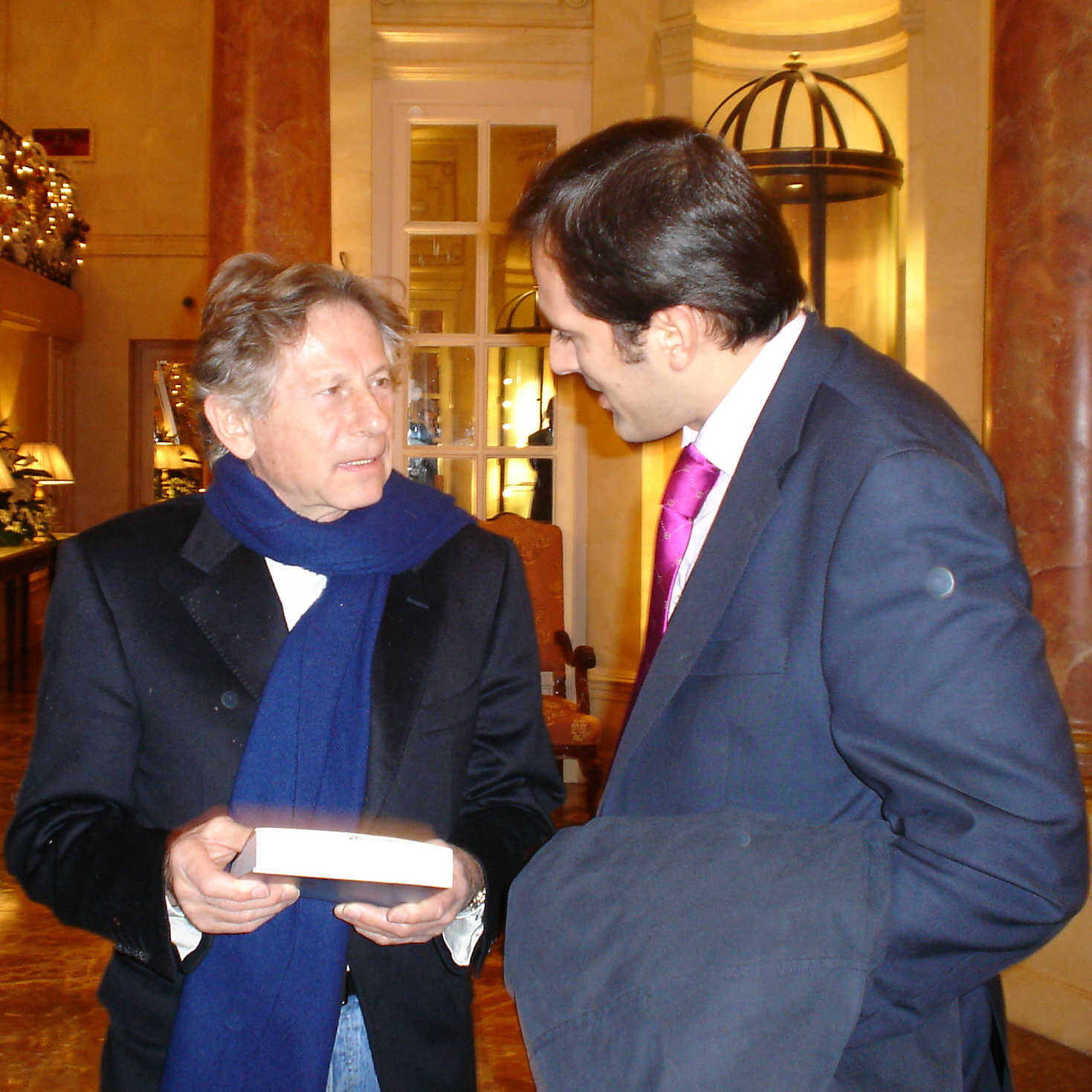
Polanski and Spanish writer Diego Moldes, Madrid 2005

==== The Ghost Writer (2010) ====
The Ghost Writer, a thriller focusing on a ghostwriter working on the memoirs of a character based loosely on former British prime minister Tony Blair, swept the European Film Awards in 2010, winning six awards, including best movie, director, actor and screenplay. When it premiered at the 60th Berlinale in February 2010, Polanski won a Silver Bear for Best Director, and in February 2011, it won four César Awards, France's version of the Academy Awards.

The film is based on the novel by British writer Robert Harris. Harris and Polanski had previously worked for many months on a film of Harris's earlier novel Pompeii, a novel that was in turn inspired by Polanski's Chinatown. They had completed a script for Pompeii and were nearing production when the film was cancelled due to a looming actors' strike in September 2007. After that film fell apart, they moved on to Harris's novel, The Ghost, and adapted it for the screen together.

The cast includes Ewan McGregor as the writer and Pierce Brosnan as former British Prime Minister Adam Lang. The film was shot on locations in Germany.

In the United States, film critic Roger Ebert included it in his top 10 picks for 2010 and stated that "this movie is the work of a man who knows how to direct a thriller. Smooth, calm, confident, it builds suspense instead of depending on shock and action." Co-star Ewan McGregor agreed, having said about Polanski that "he's a legend ... I've never examined a director and the way that they work so much before. He's brilliant, just brilliant, and absolutely warrants his reputation as a great director."

==== Carnage (2011) ====
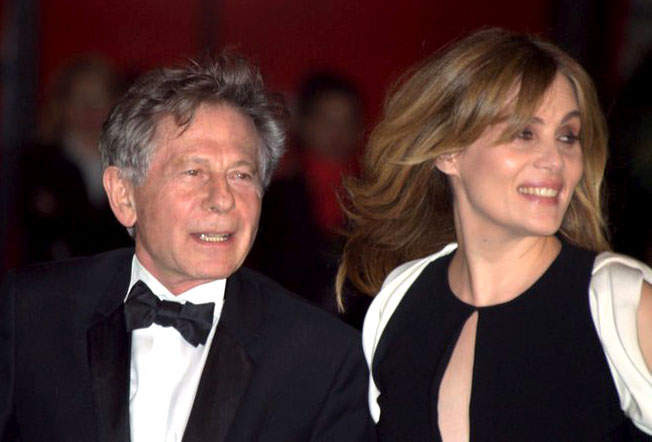
Polanski and Emmanuelle Seigner at the César Awards in 2011

Polanski shot Carnage in February/March 2011. The film is a screen version of Yasmina Reza's play God of Carnage, a comedy about two couples who meet after their children get in a fight at school, and how their initially civilized conversation devolves into chaos. It stars Kate Winslet, Jodie Foster, Christoph Waltz and John C. Reilly. Though set in New York, it was shot in Paris. The film had its world premiere on 9 September 2011 at the Venice Film Festival and was released in the United States by Sony Pictures Classics on 16 December 2011.

Co-stars Jodie Foster and Kate Winslet commented about Polanski's directing style. According to Foster, "He has a very, very definitive style about how he likes it done. He decides everything. He decided every lens. Every prop. Everything. It's all him." Winslet adds that "Roman is one of the most extraordinary men I've ever met. The guy is 77 years old. He has an effervescent quality to him. He's very joyful about his work, which is infectious. He likes to have a small crew, to the point that, when I walked on the set, my thought was, 'My God, this is it?'" However, in 2020, Winslet said she regretted working with Polanski. Also noting that style of directing, New York Film Festival director Richard Pena, during the American premiere of the film, called Polanski "a poet of small spaces ... in just a couple of rooms he can conjure up an entire world, an entire society." Polanski makes an uncredited cameo appearance as a neighbor.

==== Venus in Fur (2013) ====
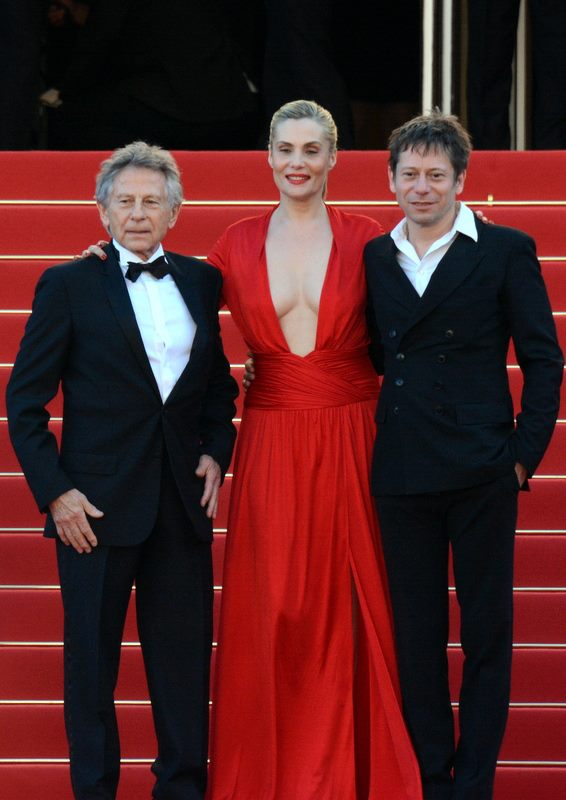
Roman Polanski, Emmanuelle Seigner and Mathieu Amalric promoting Venus in Fur at the Cannes Film Festival in 2013

Polanski's French-language adaptation of the play Venus in Fur, starred his wife Emmanuelle Seigner and Mathieu Amalric. Polanski worked with the play's author, David Ives, on the screenplay. The film was shot from December 2012 to February 2013 in French and is Polanski's first non-English-language feature film in forty years. The film premiered in competition at the 2013 Cannes Film Festival on 25 May 2013.

==== Based on a True Story (2017) ====
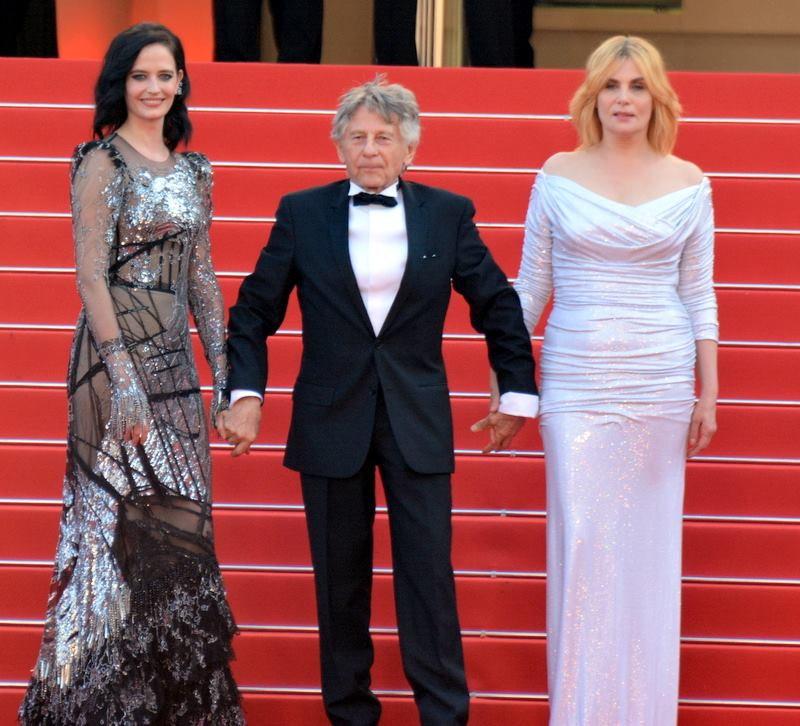
Polanski promoting Based on a True Story at the 2017 Cannes Film Festival

Polanski's Based on a True Story is an adaptation of the French novel by bestselling author Delphine de Vignan. The film follows a writer (Emmanuelle Seigner) struggling to complete a new novel, while followed by an obsessed fan (Eva Green). It started production in November 2016 from a script adapted by Polanski and Olivier Assayas. It premiered out of competition at the 2017 Cannes Film Festival on 27 May 2017 and opened in France on 1 November 2017.

==== Expulsion from the Academy of Motion Picture Arts and Sciences ====
In May 2018, the Academy of Motion Picture Arts and Sciences stated that the board "has voted to expel actor Bill Cosby and director Roman Polanski from its membership in accordance with the organisation's Standards of Conduct". Polanski is one of only four members to have been expelled from the Academy. Following its expulsion of Harvey Weinstein, the academy's Standards of Conduct had recently been revised as a result of impacts of the #MeToo and Time's Up movements on the film industry. The same year, his wife Emmanuelle Seigner rejected the invitation to join the academy, denouncing the "hypocrisy" of a group that expelled Polanski.

==== An Officer and a Spy (2019) ====
Polanski's 2019 film An Officer and a Spy (French: J'Accuse) centers on the notorious 19th century Dreyfus affair. The film stars Jean Dujardin as French officer Georges Picquart and follows his struggle from 1896 to 1906 to expose the truth about the doctored evidence that led to Alfred Dreyfus, one of the few Jewish members of the French Army's general staff, being wrongly convicted of passing military secrets to the German Empire and sent to Devil's Island. The film is written by Robert Harris, who was working with Polanski for the third time. It co-stars Louis Garrel as Dreyfus, Mathieu Amalric and Polanski's wife Emmanuelle Seigner. It was produced by Alain Goldman's Legende Films and distributed by Gaumont. Filming began on 26 November 2018 and was completed on 28 April 2019.

Although set in Paris, the film was first scheduled to shoot in Warsaw in 2014, for economic reasons. However, production was postponed after Polanski moved to Poland for filming and the U.S. Government filed extradition papers. The Polish government eventually rejected them, by which time new French film tax credits had been introduced, allowing the film to shoot on location in Paris. It was budgeted at €60m and was again set to start production in July 2016; however, its production was postponed as Polanski waited on the availability of a star, whose name was not announced. In a 2017 interview Polanski discussed the difficulty of the project:

The problem of the film is the combination of casting and financing, it's an expensive film and films of this scale are only made with a bankable star, as they say vulgarly, and the stars capable of satisfying the financial requirement I do not necessarily see in the role of Picquart, who is our main character. Apart from that, there are about fifty important roles. They should all speak with the same accent in English, otherwise it would be appalling. It is necessary so that the film can be sold around the world. To unlock the financial means to produce such a project is impossible if you shoot in French.

It had its world premiere at the Venice Film Festival on 30 August 2019. It received a standing ovation and won the Grand Jury Prize. It was released in France on 13 November 2019, by Gaumont. The film has received backlash due to the plot of the film relating to Polanski's sexual abuse case and further accusations of harassment and assault.

Polanski caused outrage by comparing his own experience's to Dreyfus's. In an interview to promote the film, Polanski said: "I am familiar with many of the workings of the apparatus of persecution shown in the film ... I can see the same determination to deny the facts and condemn me for things I have not done. Most of the people who harass me do not know me and know nothing about the case." Aside from Polanski's involvement, the film was not controversial and was generally well reviewed.

In February 2020, Polanski won Best Director at France's 2020 Cesar Awards. Neither Polanski nor the cast and crew of An Officer and a Spy attended the awards ceremony hosted at the Salle Pleyel in Paris. Polanski said that he would not submit himself to a "public lynching" over rape accusations he denies. Addressing the accusations of sexual assault leveled at him, he said, "Fantasies of unhealthy minds are now treated as proven facts." This is Polanski's fifth Best Director Cesar win, the record for a single director; he previously won for Tess, The Pianist, The Ghost Writer, and Venus in Fur. Polanski's wife Emmanuelle Seigner accepted the award on his behalf.

Prior to the awards ceremony, Polanski released a statement, saying: "For several days, people have asked me this question: Will I or won't I attend the Cesar ceremony? The question I ask in turn is this: How could I?. [...] The way the night will unfold, we already know in advance ... Activists have already threatened me with a public lynching, some have announced protests in front of the Salle Pleyel. Others intend to make it a platform to denounce (the) governing body. It promises to look more like a symposium than a celebration of cinema." Polanski said he was skipping the ceremony in order to protect his team as well as his wife and children, who "have been made to suffer injuries and affronts". Making reference to the recent media scandal that led to the Cesar board's mass resignation, Polanski added: "The press and social media have presented our 12 nominations as if they were gifts offered to us by the academy's board of directors, as some authoritarian gesture that had forced their resignations. Doing so undermines the secret vote of the 4,313 professionals who alone decide the nominations and the more than 1.5 million viewers who came to see the film".

Despite Polanski's absence from the awards ceremony, his nomination and win sparked protests due to the rape charges that he still faces. The protestors held up signs with slogans like "Shame on an industry that protects rapists". Police clashed with protestors, even firing tear gas upon them. Actions were also taken by celebrities, such as Adèle Haenel, Noémie Merlant and Celine Sciamma, who walked out of the awards. Many other celebrities and feminists spoke out against Polanski online, such as NousToutes, a French feminist collective, who called the win "shameful", and Jessica Chastain tweeted, "I Fucking Stan" in regard to the protests. At the same time some celebrities came to his defense, like actress Fanny Ardant, who said, "When I love someone, I love them passionately. And I love Roman Polanski a lot... a lot... So I'm very happy for him. Then, I understand that not everyone agrees but long live freedom!" and actress Brigitte Bardot who said, "Thankfully Polanski exists and he is saving cinema from its mediocrity! I judge him on his talent and not on his private life! I regret never having shot with him!" The actor Lambert Wilson called the protest campaign against Polanski "abominable public lynching", as did Isabelle Huppert, who stated that "lynching is a form of pornography". Likewise, Polanski's alleged victim Samantha Geimer criticized the protesters as "very opportunistic", and said that "If you want to change the world today, you do it by ... demanding people be held accountable today, not by picking someone who is famous and thinking that if you demonise him for things that happened decades ago that somehow that has any value in protecting people and changing society".

==== The Palace (2023) ====
The Palace began filming in February 2022 in Gstaad, Switzerland. The film stars Mickey Rourke, Fanny Ardant and Oliver Masucci, and is a black comedy about the guests at a Swiss luxury hotel on New Year's Eve 1999. Polanski co-wrote the screenplay with fellow Polish director Jerzy Skolimowski, who also co-wrote Polanski's first feature, Knife in the Water, in 1962. The film was unable to find financing in France due to souring French public opinion of Polanski following a new round of sexual assault allegations, and ended up being primarily funded by the Italian company, Rai Cinema. Polanski's reputation also brought casting challenges, with a number of actors turning down roles for fear of tarnishing their careers. Rai Cinema and Eliseo Entertainment produced the film. The film had its world premiere at the Venice Film Festival on 2 September 2023, before it was released theatrically in Italy by 01 Distribution on 28 September 2023.

==== 2023 Venice Film Festival controversy ====
The inclusion of films from Polanski, Woody Allen, and Luc Besson at the 2023 Venice Film Festival was controversial and brought significant criticism to its organizers due to the various sex abuse allegations against all three. Festival head Alberto Barbera defended their inclusion, saying of Polanski specifically, "I don't understand why one cannot distinguish between the responsibilities of the man and those of the artist. Polanski is 90 years old, he is one of the few working masters, he made an extraordinary film. It may be the last film of his career, although I hope he does like De Oliveira, who made films until he was 105. I stand firmly among those who in the debate distinguish between the responsibility of the man and that of the artist."

== Personal life ==
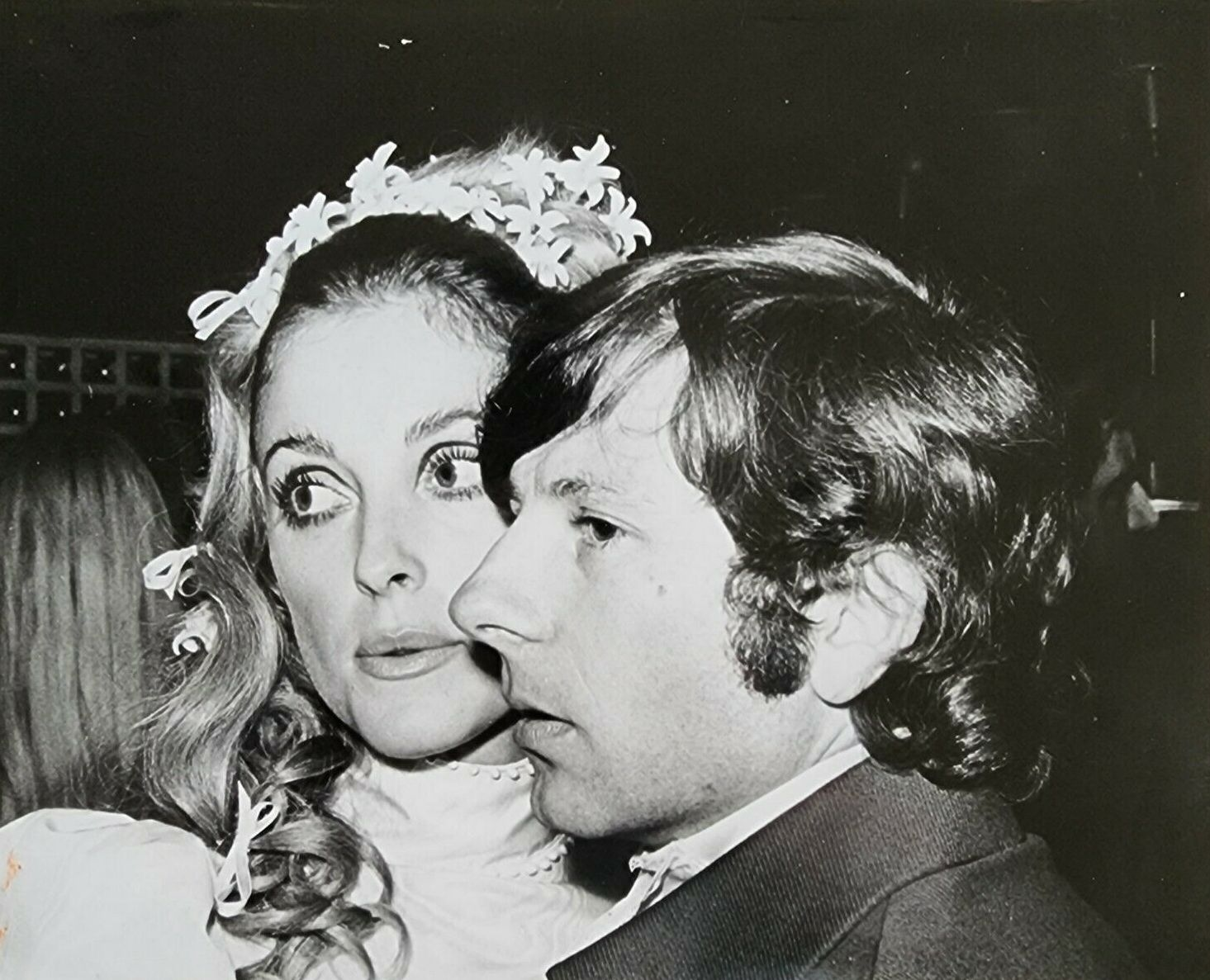
Roman Polanski with Sharon Tate in 1968

In 1959, Polanski married actress Barbara Kwiatkowska-Lass. She starred in his short film When Angels Fall. The couple separated in 1961 and divorced the next year.

Throughout the 1960s, Polanski dated a succession of actresses including Carol Lynley, Jacqueline Bisset, Jill St. John and Michelle Phillips.

Polanski met actress Sharon Tate while filming The Fearless Vampire Killers, and during the production, the two of them began dating. On 20 January 1968, Polanski and Tate married in London.

In February 1969, Polanski and Tate began renting the home at 10050 Cielo Drive in the Benedict Canyon region of Los Angeles. In August, while Polanski was in Europe working on a film, Tate remained home, eight-and-a-half months pregnant. Four Manson Family cult members broke into the home late in the evening of 8 August and proceeded to murder Tate and four others. Tate's unborn child was posthumously named Paul Richard Polanski. Charles Manson, along with members of the cult, was arrested in late 1969, eventually tried, and found guilty in 1971 of first-degree murder.

Polanski has said that his absence on the night of the murders is the greatest regret of his life. He wrote in his autobiography: "Sharon's death is the only watershed in my life that really matters", and commented that her murder changed his personality from a "boundless, untroubled sea of expectations and optimism" to one of "ingrained pessimism... eternal dissatisfaction with life". Polanski was left with a negative impression of the press, which he felt was interested in sensationalizing the lives of the victims, and indirectly himself, to attract readers. He was shocked by the lack of sympathy expressed in various news stories:

I had long known that it was impossible for a journalist to convey 100 percent of the truth, but I didn't realize to what extent the truth is distorted, both by the intentions of the journalist and by neglect. I don't mean just the interpretations of what happened; I also mean the facts. The reporting about Sharon and the murders was virtually criminal. Reading the papers, I could not believe my eyes. I could not believe my eyes! They blamed the victims for their own murders. I really despise the press. I didn't always. The press made me despise it.

In 1989, Polanski married French actress Emmanuelle Seigner. They have two children, a daughter, Morgane, and a son. Polanski and his children speak Polish at home.

== Legal history ==
In 1977, Polanski was arrested and charged with drugging and raping a 13-year-old girl. As a result of a plea bargain, he pleaded guilty to the lesser offence of unlawful sex with a minor. In 1978, after learning that the judge planned to reject his plea deal and impose a prison term instead of probation, he fled to Paris. A number of other women have later accused Polanski of raping them when they were teenagers. An Interpol red notice was issued for his arrest, and he rarely leaves France.

=== Sexual abuse ===
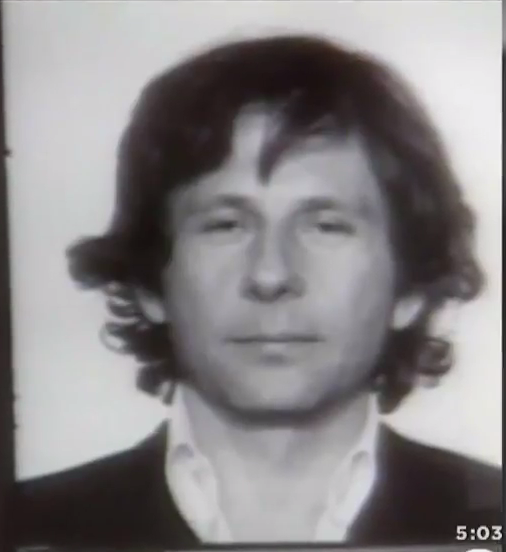
Mugshot of Polanski following his 1977 arrest

On 11 March 1977, three years after making Chinatown, Polanski was arrested at the Beverly Wilshire Hotel for the sexual assault of 13-year-old Samantha Gailey. Gailey had modeled for Polanski during a Vogue photoshoot the previous day around the swimming pool at the Bel Air home of Jack Nicholson. Polanski was indicted on six counts of criminal behavior, including rape. At his arraignment, he pleaded not guilty to all charges. Many executives in Hollywood came to his defense. Gailey's attorney arranged a plea bargain in which five of the six charges would be dismissed, and Polanski accepted.

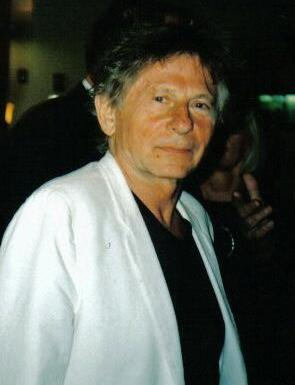
Polanski in 2007

As a result of the plea bargain, Polanski pleaded guilty to the charge of "unlawful sexual intercourse with a minor", and was ordered to undergo 90 days of psychiatric evaluation at California Institution for Men at Chino. Upon release from prison after 42 days, Polanski agreed to the plea bargain, his penalty to be time served along with probation. However, he learned afterward that the judge, Laurence J. Rittenband, had told some friends that he was going to disregard the plea bargain and sentence Polanski to 50 years in prison: "I'll see this man never gets out of jail", he told Polanski's friend, screenwriter Howard E. Koch. Gailey's attorney confirmed the judge changed his mind after he met the judge in his chambers:

He was going to sentence Polanski, rather than to time served, to fifty years. What the judge did was outrageous. We had agreed to a plea bargain and the judge had approved it.

Polanski was told by his attorney that "the judge could no longer be trusted" and that the judge's representations were "worthless". Polanski decided not to appear at his sentencing. He told his friend, producer Dino De Laurentiis, "I've made up my mind. I'm getting out of here." On 31 January 1978, the day before sentencing, Polanski left the country on a flight to London, where he had a home. One day later, he left for France. As a French citizen, he has been protected from extradition and has lived mostly in France since then.

In 1979, Polanski gave a controversial interview with novelist Martin Amis in which, discussing the case, he said "If I had killed somebody, it wouldn't have had so much appeal to the press, you see? But ... fucking, you see, and the young girls. Judges want to fuck young girls. Juries want to fuck young girls. Everyone wants to fuck young girls!"

In 1988, Gailey sued Polanski. Among other things, the suit alleged sexual assault, false imprisonment, seduction of a minor, and intentional infliction of emotional distress. In 1993, Polanski agreed to settle with his victim. In August 1996, Polanski still owed her $604,416; court filings confirm that the settlement was completed by 1997 via a confidential financial arrangement. The victim, now married and going by the name Samantha Geimer, stated in a 2003 interview with Larry King that the police and media had been slow at the time of the assault to believe her account, which she attributed to the social climate of the era. In 2008, she stated, "I don't wish for him to be held to further punishment or consequences."

On 26 September 2009, Polanski was arrested while in Switzerland at the request of United States authorities. The arrest brought renewed attention to the case and stirred controversy, particularly in the United States and Europe. Polanski was defended by many prominent individuals, including Hollywood celebrities and European artists and politicians, who called for his release. American public opinion was reported to run against him, and polls in France and Poland showed that strong majorities favored his extradition to the United States.

Polanski was jailed near Zurich for two months, then put under house arrest at his home in Gstaad while awaiting the results of his extradition appeals. On 12 July 2010, the Swiss rejected the United States' request, declared Polanski a "free man" and released him from custody. A year later, he was invited to the 2011 Zurich Film Festival where he received a lifetime achievement award. An Interpol red notice was issued in 1978 after he fled the United States, limiting his movements to France, Switzerland, and Poland. However, his name is no longer found on Interpol's wanted list.

During a television interview on 10 March 2011, Geimer blamed the media, reporters, the court, and the judge for having caused "way more damage to me and my family than anything Roman Polanski has ever done", and opined that the judge was using her and Polanski for media exposure.

In January 2014, newly uncovered emails from 2008 by a Los Angeles County Superior Court Judge, Larry P. Fidler, indicated that if Polanski returned to the United States for a hearing, the conduct of the judge who had originally presided over the case, Laurence A. Rittenband, might require that Polanski be freed. These emails were related to a 2008 documentary film by Marina Zenovich.

In late October 2014, Polanski was questioned by Polish prosecutors in Kraków. On 30 October 2015, Polish judge Dariusz Mazur denied a request by the United States to extradite Polanski, who has dual French–Polish citizenship, for a full trial, claiming that it would be "obviously unlawful". The Kraków prosecutor's office declined to challenge the court's ruling, agreeing that Polanski had served his punishment and did not need to face an American court ever again.

Poland's national justice ministry appealed, arguing that sexual abuse of minors should be prosecuted regardless of the suspect's accomplishments or the length of time since the suspected crime took place. In a December 2016 decision, the Supreme Court of Poland dismissed the government's appeal, holding that the prosecutor general had failed to prove misconduct or flagrant legal error on the part of the lower court.

Preparations for An Officer and a Spy had been stalled by the extradition request.

On 3 May 2018, Polanski was expelled from the Academy of Motion Picture Arts and Sciences, with the decision referencing the case.

Polanski has blamed Harvey Weinstein for the renewed focus on his sexual abuse case in the 2000s and claimed that Weinstein tried to brand him a "child rapist" to stop him from winning an Oscar in 2003.

In March 2023, Geimer and her husband met with Polanski and his wife Seigner for a French magazine cover interview. Geimer states in the interview: "Let me be very clear: what happened with Polanski was never a big problem for me. I didn't even know it was illegal, that someone could be arrested for it. I was fine, I'm still fine. It was so unfair and so in opposition to justice ... Everyone should know by now that Roman has served his sentence. Which was ... long, if you want my opinion. Anyone who thinks that he deserves to be in prison is wrong. It isn't the case today and it wasn't the case yesterday."

==== Documentary films ====
In 2008, the documentary film by Marina Zenovich, Roman Polanski: Wanted and Desired, was released in Europe and the United States where it won numerous awards. The film focuses on the judge in the case and the possible reasons why he changed his mind. It includes interviews with people involved in the case, including the victim, Geimer, and the prosecutor, Roger Gunson. Geimer said that the judge "didn't care what happened" to her or Polanski, but "was orchestrating some little show", while Gunson added, "I'm not surprised that Polanski left under those circumstances, ... It was going to be a real circus."

Former Los Angeles County Deputy District Attorney David Wells, whose statements were the most damning evidence in the movie, and who said he advised the judge to imprison Polanski, admitted that he lied about those statements, and said that to the documentary makers to "play up" his own role.

In December 2009, a California appellate court discussed the film's allegations as it denied Polanski's request to have the case dismissed. While saying it was "deeply concerned" by the allegations, and that the allegations were "in many cases supported by considerable evidence", it also found that "Even in light of our fundamental concern about the misconduct ... flight was not Polanski's only option. It was not even his best option." It said dismissal of the case, which would erase Polanski's guilty plea, would not be an "appropriate result", and that he still had other legal options.

In September 2011, the documentary film Roman Polanski: A Film Memoir had its world premiere in Zurich, Switzerland. During an interview in the film, he offers his apology to Geimer: "She is a double victim: My victim, and a victim of the press." On this occasion, he collected the lifetime achievement award he was to have received at the time of his arrest two years earlier.

=== Vanity Fair libel case ===
In 2004, Polanski sued Vanity Fair magazine in London for libel. A 2002 article in the magazine claimed that Polanski promised he would "make another Sharon Tate out of you" in an attempt to seduce a Scandinavian model while he was travelling to Tate's funeral. He received supporting testimony from Mia Farrow, and Vanity Fair "was unable to prove that the incident occurred". Polanski was awarded £50,000 in damages plus some of his legal costs.

=== Matan Uziel libel case ===
In December 2017, Polanski filed a ₪1.5 million suit in Herzliya Magistrates' Court against Israeli journalist and filmmaker Matan Uziel. Polanski maintained that Uziel, through his website, www.imetpolanski.com, falsely reported that five women had come forward to accuse him of raping them. Polanski was suing for libel and defamation of character. Herzliya Magistrates' Court rejected Polanski's request to be exempt from appearing in court after filing the libel suit. While Polanski gave various reasons for his inability to appear, the presiding judge, Gilad Hess, dismissed them one by one and ordered Polanski to pay Uziel ₪10,000 in costs. In November 2018, it was published that Polanski decided to drop the lawsuit, and was ordered by the court to pay Uziel ₪30,000 (US$8,000) for court costs. The court accepted Uziel's request that the suit not be dropped, but rather that it be rejected, making Polanski unable to sue Uziel again over the same issue in the future.

In late December 2019, in Polanski's interviews with Paris Match and Gazeta Wyborcza, the latter accused Matan Uziel of carefully orchestrating the attacks on his character and for playing a major role in designing an international campaign to besmirch his name and reputation in order to make his career fall from grace.

In November 2022, Polanski filed a cybersquatting dispute with the World Intellectual Property Organization against the domain name imetpolanski.com. Polanski asked the World Intellectual Property Organization to rule that the site was cybersquatting. However, the three-person panel ruled that Polanski did not show the domain was registered and used in bad faith, nor did he show that the registrant, Matan Uziel, lacked rights or legitimate interests in the domain name.

=== Academy of Motion Picture Arts and Sciences case ===
In April 2019, following his expulsion from the Academy of Motion Picture Arts and Sciences, Polanski filed a lawsuit against the academy alleging that the decision to expel him was not appropriately supported and demanding his reinstatement. In August 2020 his expulsion was upheld by the court with the judge finding that the academy's board had given Polanski a fair hearing and that they had cause to expel him.

=== Charlotte Lewis ===
In 2010, lawyer Gloria Allred appeared in a press conference with British actress Charlotte Lewis, where she stated that Polanski had forced himself on her while she was auditioning for Pirates in Paris in 1983, which she was later cast in. "He sexually abused me in the worst possible way when I was just 16 years old, four years after he fled the United States to avoid sentencing for his crime."

In 1999, Lewis had an interview with the UK's News of the World where she asserted that she had a six-month tryst with Polanski when she was 17. Lewis also talked about how Polanski treated her in the relationship: "Roman would say, 'You're gaining weight'. It was ridiculous—I was a thin teenage girl, but I took it seriously and stopped eating. Then I'd overeat, and for years I suffered from bulimia. I know that was the start."

During an interview with Paris Match in 2019, Polanski was asked about Charlotte Lewis' accusations, to which he responded "It's an odious lie!" He also pulled out a press clipping of her 1999 interview, quoting her talk about having sex with many men by the age of 14. In the interview Lewis discloses that she was drugged and prostituted at 14, which led to her sexual promiscuity and her relationship with numerous film stars, including Polanski.

Lewis alleged Polanski led a smear campaign against her, primarily founded on the Paris Match interview, and in September 2022 Polanski was ordered to stand trial in France for a defamation case from Lewis. Polanski was acquitted on 14 May 2024. He was not present in court for the verdict.

=== 2024 civil complaint ===
In June 2023, Polanski was sued in the Los Angeles Superior Court by a woman who alleged that he raped her at his home in 1973 after supplying her with tequila shots. The woman was said to be under the age of 18 at the time. The civil trial date was originally set for August 2025; however, Polanski and the woman settled the suit in October 2024.

=== Other allegations ===
In October 2017, German actress Renate Langer told Swiss police that Polanski raped her in Gstaad when she was 15, in 1972. The same month, American artist Marianne Barnard accused Polanski of sexually assaulting her in 1975, when she was 10 years old.

In November 2019, French actress Valentine Monnier said Polanski raped her at a ski chalet in Gstaad in 1975 when she was 18.

== Filmography ==
Directed features
Year	Title	Distribution
1962	Knife in the Water	Zespół Filmowy "Kamera"
1965	Repulsion	Compton Films
1966	Cul-de-sac	Compton-Cameo Films
1967	The Fearless Vampire Killers	Metro-Goldwyn-Mayer
1968	Rosemary's Baby	Paramount Pictures
1971	Macbeth	Columbia Pictures
1972	What?	NPF Planfilm
1974	Chinatown	Paramount Pictures
1976	The Tenant	Paramount Pictures
1979	Tess	Columbia Pictures
1986	Pirates	The Cannon Group, Inc.
1988	Frantic	Warner Bros.
1992	Bitter Moon	Fine Line Features
1994	Death and the Maiden	Fine Line Features
1999	The Ninth Gate	BAC Films/Araba Films
2002	The Pianist	Focus Features
2005	Oliver Twist	Pathé
2010	The Ghost Writer	StudioCanal UK
2011	Carnage	Sony Pictures Classics
2013	Venus in Fur	BAC Films
2017	Based on a True Story	BAC Films
2019	An Officer and a Spy	Gaumont/01 Distribution
2023	The Palace	01 Distribution

== Awards and nominations ==
Year	Title	Academy Awards		BAFTA Awards		Golden Globe Awards	
Year	Title	Nominations	Wins	Nominations	Wins	Nominations	Wins
1962	Knife in the Water	1		1			
1965	Repulsion			1			
1966	Cul-de-sac			1			
1968	Rosemary's Baby	2	1	1		4	1
1971	Macbeth			2	1		
1974	Chinatown	11	1	11	3	7	4
1979	Tess	6	3	3	1	4	2
1986	Pirates	1					
2002	The Pianist	7	3	7	2	2	
2011	Carnage					2	
Total		28	8	27	6	19	7

=== Directed Academy Award performances ===
Under Polanski's direction, these actors have received Academy Award nominations (and wins) for their performances in their respective roles.

Year	Performer	Film	Result
Academy Award for Best Actor
1974	Jack Nicholson	Chinatown	Nominated
2002	Adrien Brody	The Pianist	Won
Academy Award for Best Actress
1974	Faye Dunaway	Chinatown	Nominated
Academy Award for Best Supporting Actress
1968	Ruth Gordon	Rosemary's Baby	Won

== Bibliography ==
- Polanski, Roman (1973) Roman Polanski's What? From the original screenplay, London: Lorrimer. 91p. ISBN 0-85647-033-3
- Polanski, Roman (1973) What?, New York: Third press, 91p, ISBN 0-89388-121-X
- Polanski, Roman (1975) Three film scripts: Knife in the water [original screenplay by Jerzy Skolimowski, Jakub Goldberg and Roman Polanski; translated by Boleslaw Sulik]; Repulsion [original screenplay by Roman Polanski and Gerard Brach]; Cul-de-sac [original screenplay by Roman Polanski and Gerard Brach], introduction by Boleslaw Sulik, New York: Fitzhenry and Whiteside, 275p, ISBN 0-06-430062-5
- Polanski, Roman (1984) Knife in the water, Repulsion and Cul-de-sac: three filmscripts by Roman Polanski, London: Lorrimer, 214p, ISBN 0-85647-051-1 (hbk) ISBN 0-85647-092-9 (pbk)
- Polanski, Roman (1984, 1985) Roman by Polanski, New York: Morrow. ISBN 0-688-02621-4, London: Heinemann. London: Pan. 456p. ISBN 0-434-59180-7 (hbk) ISBN 0-330-28597-1 (pbk)
- Polanski, Roman (2003) Le pianiste, Paris: Avant-Scene, 126p, ISBN 2-84725-016-6

=== Works about ===
- Ain-Krupa, Julia (2010). Roman Polanski: A Life in Exile. ABC-CLIO. ISBN 978-0-313-37780-8.
- Bird, Daniel (2002). Roman Polanski. Pocket Essentials. ISBN 978-1-903047-89-7.
- Feeney, F. X. (2006). Roman Polanski. Taschen. ISBN 978-3-82282-543-3.
- Mazierska, Ewa (15 June 2007). Roman Polanski: The Cinema of a Cultural Traveller. I.B.Tauris. ISBN 978-1-84511-296-7.
- Parker, John (1993). Polanski. Victor Gollancz. ISBN 978-0-57505-615-2.
- Polanski, Roman (1984). Roman by Polanski. Heinemann. ISBN 978-0-43459-180-0.
- Polanski, Roman; Cronin, Paul (2005). Roman Polanski: Interviews. Univ. Press of Mississippi. ISBN 978-1-57806-799-2.
- Sandford, Christopher (2007). Polanski: A Biography. Random House. ISBN 978-1-84413-879-1.
- Wexman, Virginia Wright (1987). Roman Polanski. Columbus. ISBN 978-0-86287-355-4.

== See also ==
- List of atheists in film, radio, television and theater
