= Szarka =

Szarka is a Hungarian surname meaning magpie. Derived from Proto-Slavic *sorka, it is a cognate of various surnames, including Sraka (Slovene), Straka (Czech/Slovak), Sroka (Polish), and Soroka (East Slavic).

Notable people with the surname include:

- Adrienn Szarka (born 1991), Hungarian handballer
- Ákos Szarka (born 1990), Slovak footballer
- Chris Szarka (born 1975), Canadian football player
- Krisztina Szarka (born 1986), Hungarian gymnast
- László Szarka (born 1953), Hungarian historian
- Liam Szarka, American football player
- Robin Szarka (born 1991), German footballer
- Zoltán Szarka (1942–2016), Hungarian footballer
