= Straka =

Straka (feminine: Straková) is a Czech and Slovak surname, meaning 'magpie'. It is a cognate of the Slovene surname Sraka, Polish Sroka, East Slavic Soroka and Hungarian Szarka. Notable people with the surname include:

- Andy Straka (born 1958), American novelist
- Anna Straková (born 1973), Czech long distance runner
- František Straka (born 1958), Czech football manager
- Gábor Straka (born 1981), Hungarian-Slovak footballer
- Helena Straková (born 1975), Czech swimmer
- Iva Straková (born 1980), Czech high jump athlete
- Jakub Straka (born 1997), Slovak footballer
- Jerry Straka, American atmospheric scientist
- Josef Straka (rower, born 1904), (1904–1976), Czech rower
- Josef Straka (rower, born 1948), (born 1948), Czech rower
- Josef Straka (ice hockey) (born 1978), Czech ice hockey player
- Hellmuth Straka (1922–1987), Austrian archaeologist
- Martin Straka (born 1972), Czech ice hockey player
- Mike Straka (born 1969), American television host, author and producer
- Pavol Straka (born 1980), Slovak footballer
- Petr Straka (born 1992), Czech ice hockey player
- Sepp Straka (born 1993), Austrian golfer
- Tomás Straka (born 1972), Venezuelan historian
- Václav Straka (born 1978), Czech handball player

== See also ==
- Straka Academy, a government building of the Czech Republic
- Straky
