= Sorola =

Sorola is a surname. Notable people with the surname include:

- Gus Sorola (born 1978), American actor and podcast host
- Manuel Sorola (1880–1957), American intelligence agent

== See also ==
- Soroka
