= Soroko =

Soroko or Sorokko is a surname, a variant of Soroka. Notable people with the surname include:

- Artyom Soroko (born 1992), Belarusian football player
- Grigory Soroko (born 1944), Belarusian musician, conductor, and public activist
- Lev Soroko (1923–2009), Soviet and Russian physicist
- Serge Sorokko (born 1954), American art dealer and publisher
- Tatiana Sorokko (born 1971), Russian-born American model
- Zdislav Soroko, Soviet sprint canoer
