= Doris Tate =

American crime victim rights activist (1924–1992)

- Tate (seated) in 1992 being acknowledged by President George H. W. Bush for her work in support of victims' rights. Also pictured are Tate's other daughters, Patti (left) and Debra (right).
- Born: Doris Gwendolyn Willett; January 16, 1924; Houston, Texas, U.S.
- Died: July 10, 1992 (aged 68); Los Angeles, California, U.S.
- Resting place: Holy Cross Cemetery
- Spouse: Paul Tate
- Children: 3, including Sharon Tate

Doris Gwendolyn Tate (née Willett; January 16, 1924 – July 10, 1992) was an American activist for the rights of crime victims, and the mother of actress Sharon Tate. After Sharon Tate and several others were murdered by members of the Manson Family in 1969, Doris Tate began working to raise public awareness about the U.S. corrections system. She was influential in a court decision that amended California criminal laws relating to the rights of victims of violent crime.

== Life and career ==
Born in Houston, Texas, Tate was the second daughter of Dorris W. Willett and his wife, Fannie R. Leuch. Her elder sister was Genevieve Willett.

Doris was a housewife and mother of three daughters with her husband Paul Tate (1922–2005). In 1969, her eldest daughter, Sharon, was at the beginning of a film career, and married to film director Roman Polanski. Eight months pregnant with their first child (who would have been Doris' first grandchild), Tate and four others were murdered at the Polanskis' rented Beverly Hills home in a case that was sensationalized throughout the world. The killers were eventually identified as Tex Watson, Susan Atkins and Patricia Krenwinkel, acting on behalf of the leader of their group, Charles Manson. All four were found guilty of the murders and sentenced to death, along with Leslie Van Houten, who had not participated in the murder of the Tate victims, but had participated in the murder of a Los Angeles couple the following night. The death sentences were overturned before they could be applied when the State of California temporarily abolished the death penalty.

For more than a decade after the murders, Tate battled depression and was withdrawn and unable to discuss her daughter's death. In 1982, she was told that Leslie Van Houten had obtained 900 signatures supporting her quest to achieve parole. Tate mounted a public campaign against Van Houten, winning the support of the National Enquirer, which printed coupons in its magazine for people to sign and send to Doris Tate. With more than 350,000 signatures, Tate demonstrated that a considerable number of people opposed Van Houten's parole, which was denied.

Tate then appeared on various television talk shows, discussing her opinion of the corrections system and the impact her daughter's murder had had on her family. She joined the Los Angeles chapter of the "Parents of Murdered Children" organization, and while she drew support from the group, also found that she was rewarded by assuming the role of counsellor. She later became an active member of the Victim Offender Reconciliation and Justice for Homicide Victims groups. She founded COVER, the Coalition on Victim's Equal Rights, and served on the California State Advisory Committee on Correctional Services as a victims' representative.

She was part of a group that worked toward the passage of Proposition 8, the Victim's Rights Bill, which was passed in 1982. It allowed the presentation of victim impact statements during the sentencing of violent attackers. Tate became the first Californian to make such a statement after the law was passed, when she spoke at the parole hearing of one of her daughter's killers.

In 1984, she ran for the California State Assembly as an advocate for victim's rights. Though unsuccessful, she continued to campaign for changes to existing laws, and was involved in the passage of Proposition 89, which allowed the governor of the state to overturn decisions made by the Board of Prison Terms.

Tate's assessment of Manson, Watson, Atkins, Krenwinkel and Van Houten was that their crimes were so vicious as to warrant execution. Addressing Charles Watson at his 1984 parole hearing, she said, "What mercy, Sir, did you show my daughter when she was begging for her life? What mercy did you show my daughter when she said give me two weeks to have my baby and then you can kill me? ... When will Sharon come up for parole?... Will these seven victims and possibly more walk out of their graves if you get paroled? You cannot be trusted." She confronted Watson again at his 1990 parole hearing.

== Illness, death and legacy ==
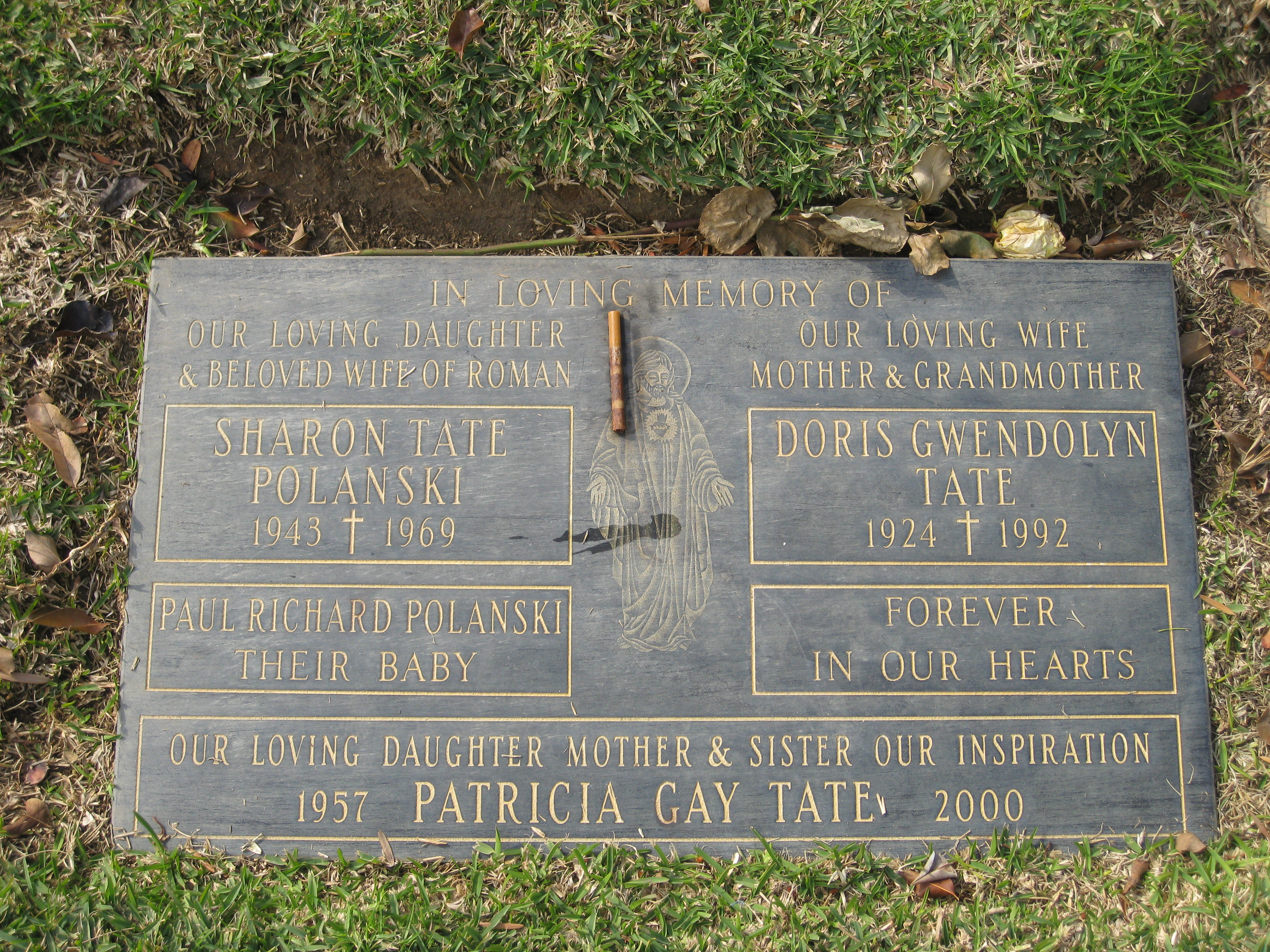
The Tate family grave at Holy Cross Cemetery, Culver City, California, in which Doris, her daughters Sharon and Patti, and Sharon's unborn son Paul are buried

Doris Tate's health began to deteriorate after she was diagnosed with a brain tumor. In 1992, she was one of several volunteer workers recognized by President George H. W. Bush as one of a "Thousand Points of Light." The ceremony, during which Tate and her family were honored by the President for their work in promoting victims' rights, marked Tate's final public appearance. She died later that year at the age of 68.

Her work was taken over by her younger daughters, Debra and Patricia (nicknamed Patti). The Doris Tate Crime Victims Bureau, a non-profit organization with the aim of monitoring criminal legislation and raising public awareness began in Sacramento, California in July 1993. In 1995, the Doris Tate Crime Victims Foundation was established with the aim of providing assistance to victims and their families. Patti began to represent the Tate family at parole hearings. In 1997, Debra Tate (born 6 November 1952) attended the parole hearing of Patricia Krenwinkel and since then has attended the parole hearings of every member of the Manson family imprisoned for the Tate–Labianca murders. She actively campaigns against the release of any of the Manson family convicted of murder.

On 3 June 2000, Doris' youngest daughter, Patricia (born 30 October 1957) died of breast cancer.

In May 2005, Doris' husband Paul died, reportedly of congestive heart failure.

== See also ==
- List of notable brain tumor patients
