= Holy Cross Cemetery (Culver City, California) =

Catholic cemetery in California, US

Coordinates: 33°59′48″N 118°22′48″W

Holy Cross Cemetery and Mortuary
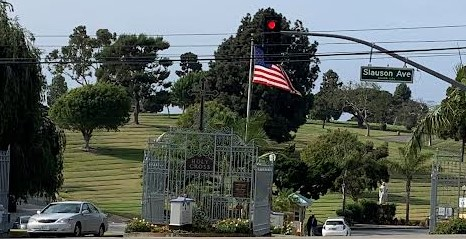
- The entrance to the cemetery
- Interactive map of Holy Cross Cemetery and Mortuary

Details
- Established: 1939
- Location: Culver City, California
- Country: United States
- Type: Catholic
- Owned by: Los Angeles Archdiocese
- Size: 200 acres (0.81 km^{2})
- Website: Official website
- Find a Grave: Holy Cross Cemetery and Mortuary

Holy Cross Cemetery is a Catholic cemetery and funeral home at 5835 West Slauson Avenue in Culver City, California, operated by the Los Angeles Archdiocese.

It is partially in the Culver City city limits.

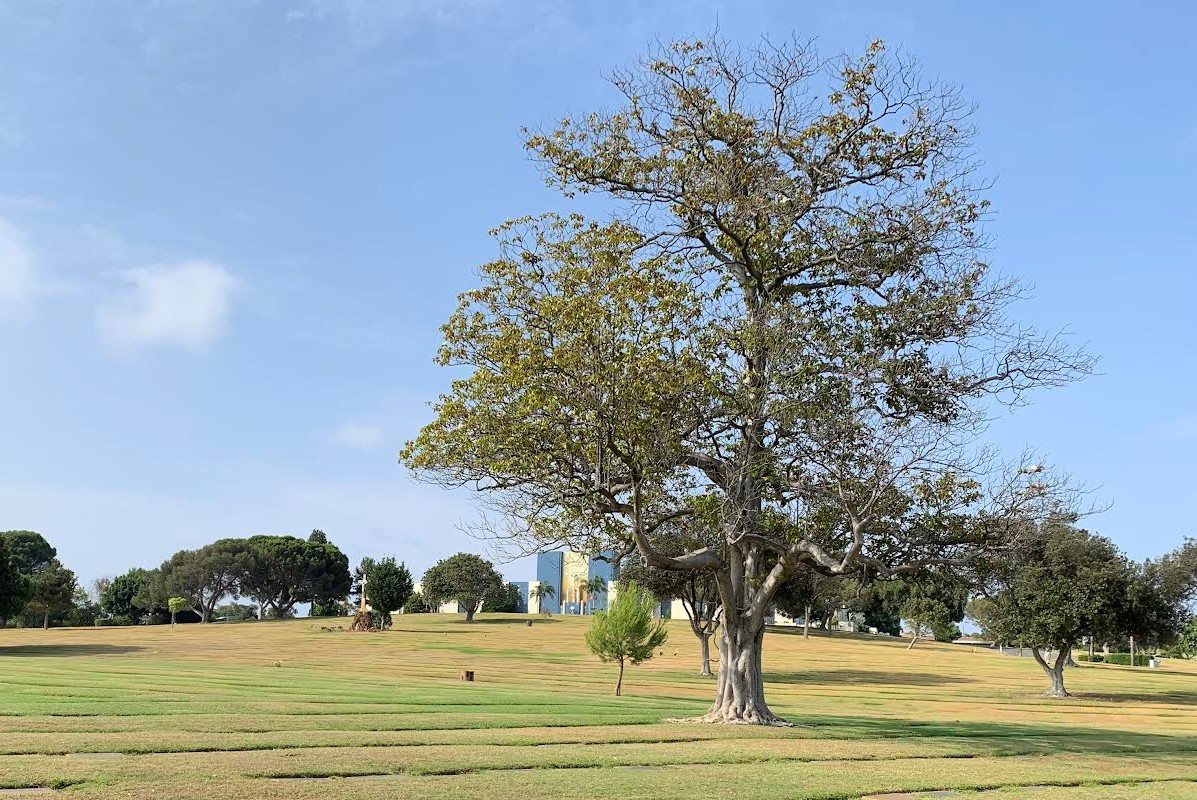
Grounds of the cemetery as seen in July 2021

Opened in 1939, Holy Cross comprises 200 acres (81 ha). Many entertainment professionals are buried there, particularly in the sections near "The Grotto" in the southwest part of the cemetery.

== Notable burials ==
=== A ===
- Gypsy Abbott (1896–1952), actress
- Jean Acker (1893–1978), actress, first wife of Rudolph Valentino
- Frank Albertson (1909–1964), actor
- Sara Allgood (1879–1950), actress
- Cecilia Alvear (1939–2017), journalist
- Ramsay Ames (1919–1998), actress
- Tod Andrews (1914–1972), actor
- Richard Arlen (1899–1976), actor
- Henry Armetta (1888–1945), actor
- Mary Astor (1906–1987), actress

=== B ===
- Fred Baczewski (1926–1976), Major League Baseball player
- Joan Banks (1918–1998), actress
- Sam Barry (1892–1950), Hall of Fame basketball coach
- John Beradino (1917–1996), actor, Major League Baseball player
- Johnny Bero (1922–1985), Major League Baseball player
- Sally Blane (1910–1997), actress
- Alfred S. Bloomingdale (1916–1982), department store heir, had affair with model Vicki Morgan, a murder victim
- Betsy Bloomingdale (1922–2016), widow of Alfred Bloomingdale, socialite and author
- Ann Blyth (1927-2026), actress
- Joseph Bodner (1925–1982), American illustrator and painter
- Roman Bohnen (1901–1949), actor
- Ray Bolger (1904–1987), actor and dancer best known for his role of The Scarecrow in The Wizard of Oz
- Fortunio Bonanova (1895–1969), actor
- Charles Boyer (1899–1978), actor
- Scott Brady (1924–1985), actor
- Keefe Brasselle (1923–1981), actor, producer and writer
- Joseph Breen (1890–1965), former head of the Production Code Administration
- Argentina Brunetti (1907–2005), actress
- Sonny Burke (1914–1980), bandleader, composer, arranger, and record producer
- Dick Butkus (1942–2023), football player and actor
- Daws Butler (1916–1988), actor and voice-over artist best known for voicing Huckleberry Hound, Yogi Bear, Quick Draw McGraw, Snagglepuss, and others

=== C ===
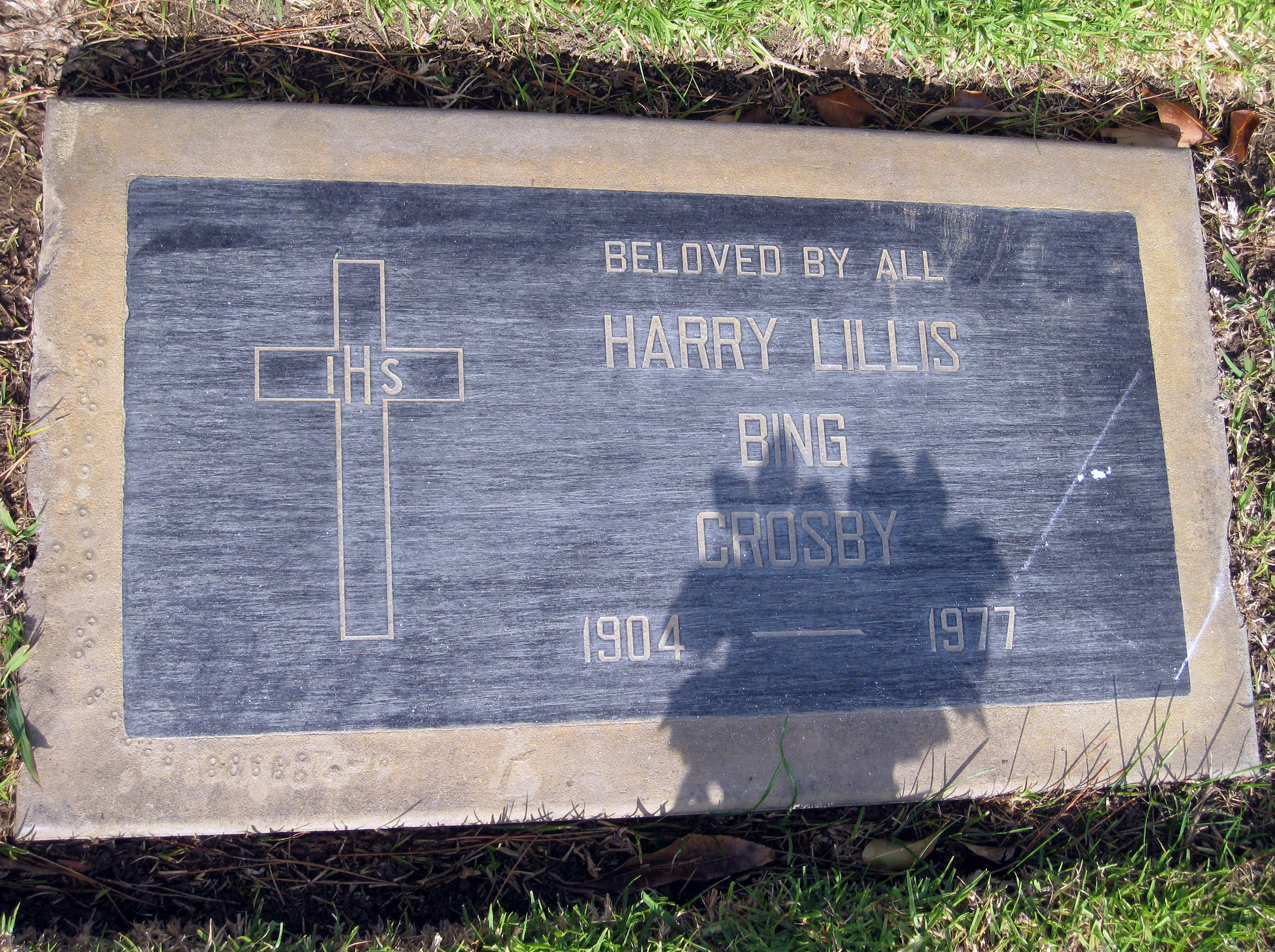
Grave of Bing Crosby, marked with an incorrect birth year

- John Candy (1950–1994), actor and comedian
- Macdonald Carey (1913–1994), actor
- Walter Catlett (1889–1960), actor
- Hobart Cavanaugh (1886–1950), actor
- Marguerite Chapman (1918–1999), actress
- D. Worth Clark (1902–1955), U.S. Senator (1939–1945) from Idaho
- Ruth Clifford (1900–1998), actress
- Bill Cody (1891–1948), actor
- Pinto Colvig (1892–1967), actor and voice-over artist, best known for voicing Goofy
- Joe Connelly (1917–2003), television writer and producer
- Jackie Coogan (1914–1984), actor, best known for pairing with Charlie Chaplin as a child actor and for playing Uncle Fester in The Addams Family
- Charles Correll (1890–1972), actor and comedian
- Jeanne Coyne (1923–1973), actress, dancer and choreographer
- Darby Crash (1958–1980), musician
- Bing Crosby (1903–1977), actor and singer (Father of Dennis, Lindsay, Phillip Crosby)
- Dennis Crosby (1934–1991), actor and singer (Son of Bing Crosby)
- Kathryn Crosby (1933-2024), actress and singer (Second Wife of Bing Crosby)
- Lindsay Crosby (1938–1989), actor and singer (Son of Bing Crosby)
- Phillip Crosby (1934–2004), actor and singer (Son of Bing Crosby)
- Leo Cullum (1942–2010), cartoonist
- Dick Curtis (1902–1952), actor

=== D ===
- Mona Darkfeather (1883–1977), actress
- Joan Davis (1907–1961), actress and comedian
- Virginia Davis (1918–2009), child actress
- Bobby Day (1928–1990), singer
- Dennis Day (1916–1988), actor, singer and comedian
- Pedro de Cordoba (1881–1950), actor
- Fred de Cordova (1910–2001), director and producer
- Eadie Del Rubio (1921–1996), musician
- Elena Del Rubio (1921–2001), musician
- Milly Del Rubio (1921–2011), musician
- Jean Del Val (1891–1975), actor
- Ralph DePalma (1892–1956), champion racecar driver, won 1915 Indianapolis 500, inducted into International Motorsports Hall of Fame in 1991
- Johnny Desmond (1919–1985), actor and singer
- John Doucette (1921–1994), actor
- Constance Dowling (1920–1969), actress
- Doris Dowling (1923–2004), actress
- William Dozier (1908–1991), producer best known for creating the TV series Batman
- Tom Drake (1918–1982), actor
- Al Dubin (1891–1945), songwriter
- Jimmy Durante (1893–1980), actor and comedian
- Mervyn Dymally (1926–2012), former Lieutenant Governor of California and U.S. Congressman from California.

=== E ===
- Vince Edwards (1928–1996), actor
- Richard Egan (1921–1987), actor

=== F ===
- Nanette Fabray (1920-2018), actress
- John Fante (1909–1983), novelist, short-story and screenwriter.
- John Farrow (1904–1963), director, husband of actress Maureen O'Sullivan, father of actress Mia Farrow
- Emily Fitzroy (1860–1954), actress
- James Flavin (1906–1976), actor
- Joe Flynn (1924–1974), actor and comedian, best known for playing Captain Binghamton in the 1960s ABC sitcom McHale's Navy
- George J. Folsey (1898–1988), cinematographer
- Francis Ford (1881–1959), actor, writer and director
- John Ford (1894–1974), director
- Paul Ford (1901–1976), actor
- Wallace Ford (1898–1966), actor
- Victoria Forde (1896–1964), actress
- Norman Foster (1900–1976), actor and director
- Gene Fowler (1890–1960), writer
- Mary Frann (1943–1998), actress
- Thelma Furness, Viscountess Furness (1904–1970), twin sister of Gloria Morgan Vanderbilt

=== G ===
- Richard "Skeets" Gallagher (1891–1955), actor
- William Garity (1899–1971), sound engineer
- Pauline Garon (1900–1965), actress
- Mike Gazella (1895–1978), MLB player
- Charles Gemora (1903–1961), actor and stuntman
- Margaret Gibson (1894–1964), actress
- Gaston Glass (1899–1965), actor
- James Gleason (1882–1959), actor
- Jose Gonzales-Gonzales (1922–2000), actor
- Pedro Gonzalez-Gonzalez (1925–2006), actor
- Bonita Granville (1923–1988), actress
- Gilda Gray (1895–1959), actress and dancer
- Robert Greig (1879–1958), actor
- Fathia Ghali (1930–1976), princess of Egypt

=== H ===
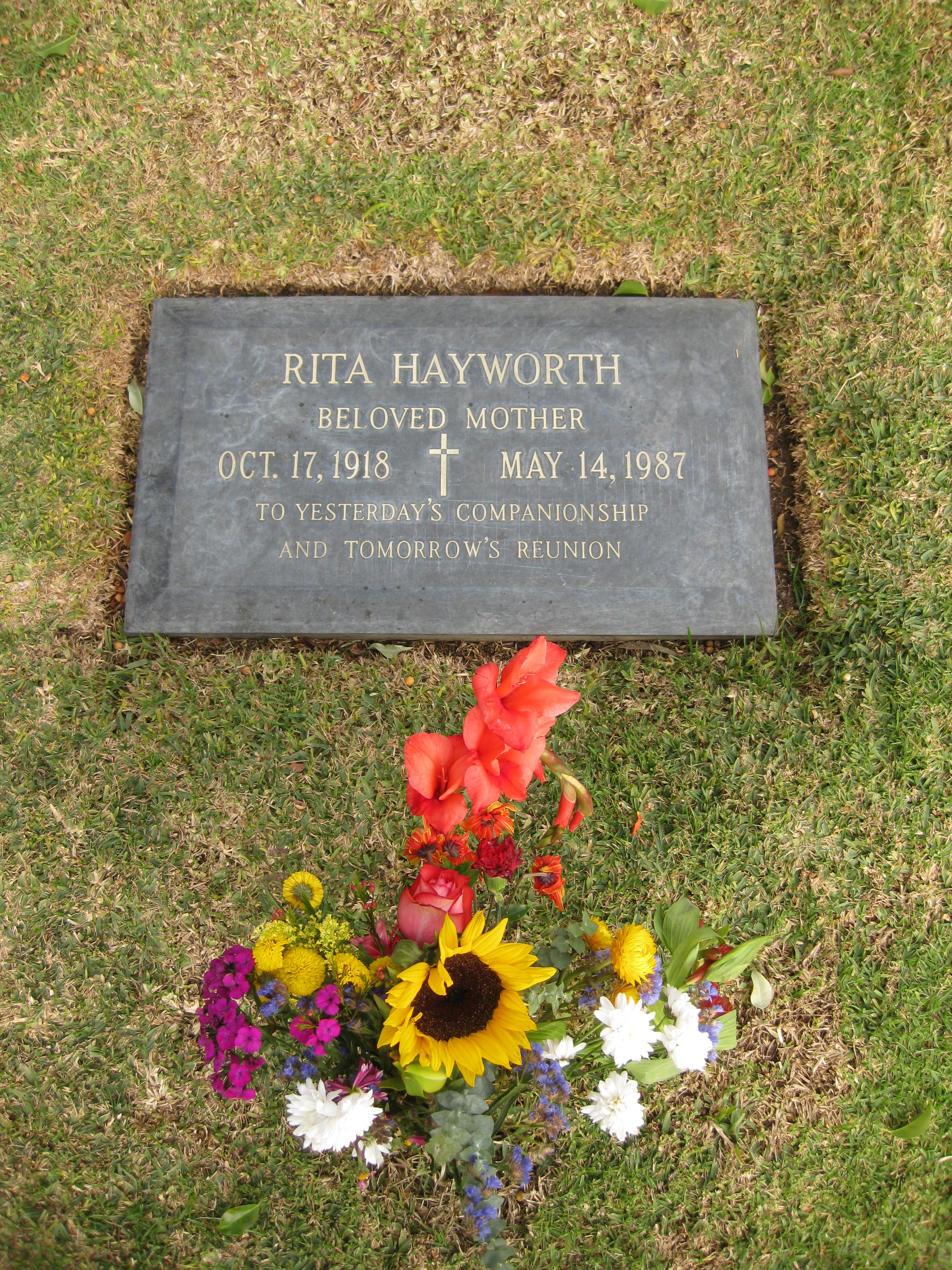
Grave of Rita Hayworth

- Jack Haley (1898–1979), actor and comedian best known for his role of The Tin Man in The Wizard of Oz
- Jack Haley Jr. (1933–2001), director, producer and writer
- Joe Hamilton (1929–1991), producer
- Kipp Hamilton (1934–1981), actress
- Fred Haney (1898–1977), MLB player and manager
- Juanita Hansen (1895–1961), actress
- Neal Hart (1879-1949), actor and director
- Henry Hathaway (1898–1985), director and producer
- June Haver (1926–2005), actress
- Allison Hayes (1930–1977), actress
- Rita Hayworth (1918–1987), actress and dancer
- Volga Hayworth (1897–1945), dancer and vaudevillian, mother of Rita Hayworth
- Chick Hearn (1916–2002), sports broadcaster
- Emmaline Henry (1928–1979), actress
- Hugh Herbert (1887–1952), actor and comedian
- Dwayne Hickman (1934–2022), actor
- Barron Hilton (1927–2019), business executive
- Conrad Hilton Jr. (1926–1969), business executive and TWA director, heir of Hilton Hotel chain
- Taylor Holmes (1878–1959), actor
- Stan Hough (1918–1990), former vice-president of 20th Century Fox
- Sophia Hutchins (1996–2025), socialite

=== I ===
- Earl Michael Irving (1953–2022), diplomat
- Amparo Iturbi (1899–1969), composer and concert pianist
- José Iturbi (1895–1980), composer and concert pianist

=== J ===
- Rita Johnson (1913–1965), actress
- Spike Jones (1911–1965), musician and comedian
- Jim Jordan (1896–1988), actor and comedian
- Marian Jordan (1898–1961), actress and comedian

=== K ===
- Herbert Kalmus (1881–1963), co-inventor of Technicolor
- Robert Keith (1898–1966), actor
- Paul Kelly (1899–1956), actor
- Charles Kemper (1900–1950), actor
- Edgar Kennedy (1890–1948), actor and comedian
- J. M. Kerrigan (1884–1964), actor
- Norman Kerry (1894–1956), actor
- Cammie King (1934–2010), child actress
- Henry King (1886–1982), director
- James Kirkwood Sr. (1875–1963), actor and director
- Helen Kleeb (1907–2003), actress

=== L ===
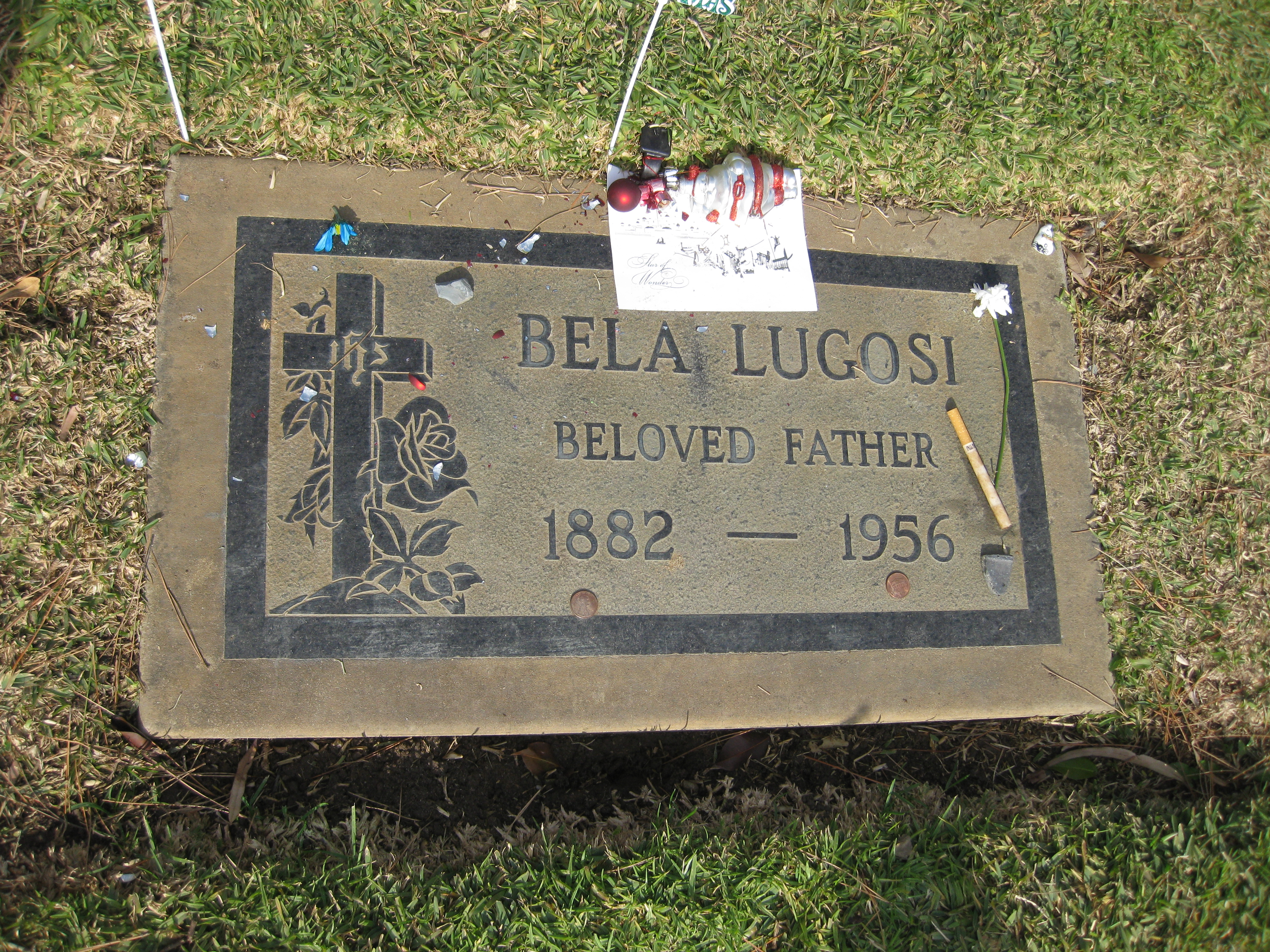
Grave of Bela Lugosi

- Jack La Rue (1902–1984), actor
- Sir Lancelot (1902–2001), singer
- Mario Lanza (1921–1959), actor and singer
- Eddie Laughton (1903–1952), actor
- Tim Layana (1964–1999), MLB pitcher
- Dorothy Leavey (1897–1998), philanthropist
- Dixie Lee (1909–1952) actress, dancer and singer (Bing Crosby's first wife)
- Jimmy Lennon (1913–1992), sports announcer
- Joan Leslie (1925-2015), actress
- Nick Licata (1897–1974), mobster
- Margaret Lindsay (1910–1981), actress
- David Lloyd (1934–2009), screenwriter
- Gene Lockhart (1891–1957), actor
- June Lockhart (1925-2025), actress
- Kathleen Lockhart (1894–1978), actress
- Ella Logan (1913–1969), actress and singer
- Frank Lovejoy (1912–1962), actor
- Peanuts Lowrey (1917–1986), MLB outfielder
- Bela Lugosi (1882–1956), actor
- William Lundigan (1914–1975), actor
- Betty Lynn (1926–2021), actress

=== M ===
- Donald MacBride (1889–1957), actor
- Ranald MacDougall (1915–1973), screenwriter
- Fred MacMurray (1908–1991), actor
- Gene Mako (1916–2013), tennis player
- Effa Manley (1897–1981), owner of Newark Eagles
- Eddie Mannix (1891–1963), movie studio executive
- Toni Mannix (1906–1983), wife of Eddie Mannix
- George Marshall (1891–1975), director
- Harry Martin (1889–1951), medical director of 20th Century Fox Studios and third husband of Louella Parsons
- Marion Martin (1909–1985), actress
- Alfredo Ramos Martínez (1871–1946), artist, educator
- Al Martino (1927–2009), singer
- Rudolph Maté (1898–1964), cinematographer and director
- May McAvoy (1899–1984), actress
- Leo McCarey (1898–1969), director
- Christine McIntyre (1911–1984), actress
- David McLean (1922–1995), actor
- Stephen McNally (1913–1994), actor
- Audrey Meadows (1922–1996), actress
- Ann Miller (1923–2004), actress, singer, dancer
- Millard Mitchell (1903–1953), actor
- James V. Monaco (1885–1945), composer
- Ricardo Montalbán (1920–2009), actor
- Carlotta Monti (1907–1993), actress
- James C. Morton (1884–1942), actor
- Alan Mowbray (1896–1969), actor
- Jack Mulhall (1887–1979), actor
- Richard Murphy (1912–1993), screenwriter, director and producer
- Jim Murray (1919–1998), sportswriter
- Johnny Murray (1904–1956), voice actor
- Nicholas Musuraca (1892–1975), cinematographer

=== N ===
- Anne Nagel (1915–1966), actress
- Reggie Nalder (1907–1991), actor
- Grete Natzler (1906–1999), actress and singer
- Evelyn Nesbit (1884–1967), actress
- Fred C. Newmeyer (1881–1967), director

=== O ===
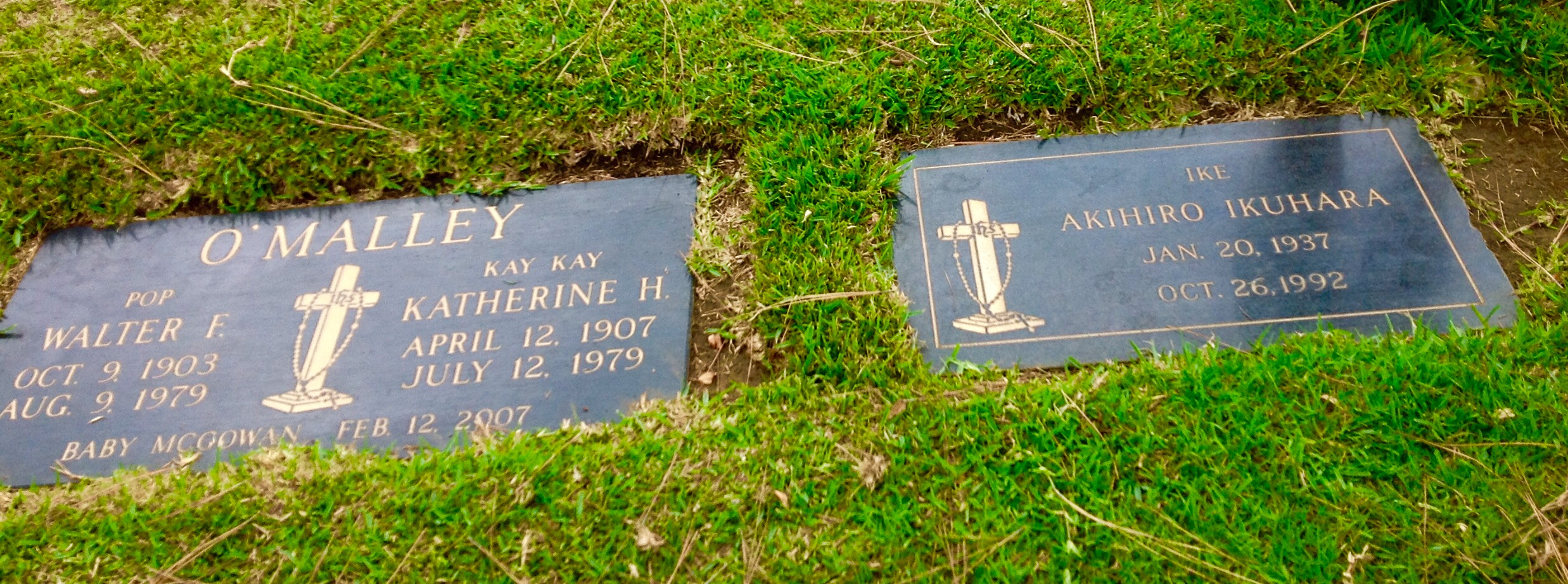
Grave of Walter O'Malley (left)

- Edmond O'Brien (1915–1985), actor
- Pat O'Brien (1899–1983), actor
- Helen O'Connell (1920–1993), singer
- Rod O'Connor (1914–1964), announcer
- Walter O'Malley (1903–1979), baseball executive, owner of the Los Angeles Dodgers
- Terry O'Malley Seidler (1933–2025), baseball owner
- Barney Oldfield (1878–1946), race car driver, actor
- Kid Ory (1886–1973), trombonist and bandleader, Dixieland jazz

=== P ===
- Robert Paige (1911–1987), actor
- George Pal (1908–1980), director, producer and animator
- Erv Palica (1928–1982), MLB pitcher
- Hermes Pan (1910–1990), choreographer and dancer
- Louella Parsons (1881–1972), writer and columnist
- Marty Pasetta (1932–2015), television producer and director
- Pat Paterson (1910–1978), actress
- Chris Penn (1965–2006), actor
- Leo Penn (1921–1998), actor and director
- Jean Peters (1926–2000), actress
- ZaSu Pitts (1894–1963), actress and comedian
- John Polich (1916–2001), NHL player
- Paul Porcasi (1879–1946), actor
- Jerry Priddy (1919–1980), MLB second baseman
- Dick Purcell (1908–1944), actor

=== R ===
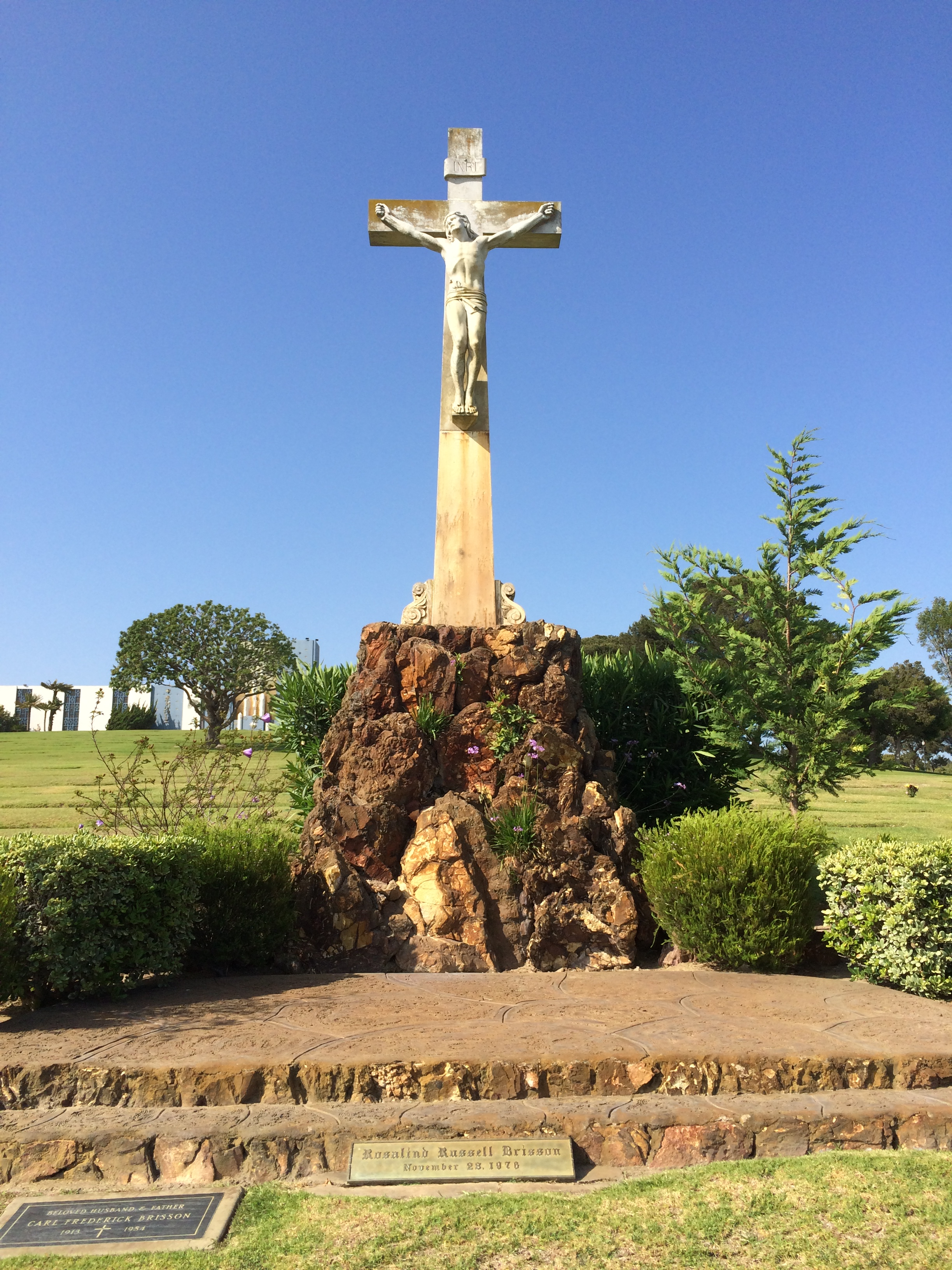
Grave of Rosalind Russell at Holy Cross

- Rosa Raisa (1893–1963), opera singer
- Clive Revill (1930-2025), actor, best known for voicing Emperor Palpatine in The Empire Strikes Back
- Alejandro Rey (1930–1987), actor
- Kane Richmond (1906–1973), actor
- Hayden Rorke (1910–1987), actor
- Rip Russell (1915–1976), MLB infielder and outfielder
- Rosalind Russell (1907–1976), actress
- Eileen Ryan (1927–2022), actress
- Faiza Rauf (1923–1994) princess of Egypt

=== S ===
- Nazli Sabri (1894–1978), former Queen consort of Egypt.
- Gia Scala (1934–1972), actress
- Fred F. Sears (1913–1957), actor and director
- Dorothy Sebastian (1903–1957), actress
- Edward Sedgwick (1889–1953), actor, director, screenwriter, and producer
- Miriam Seegar (1907–2011), actress
- John F. Seitz (1892–1979), cinematographer and inventor.
- Mack Sennett (1880–1960), mogul
- Frank Shannon (1874–1959), actor
- Diane Sherbloom (1942–1961), figure skater
- Margarita Sierra (1936–1963), singer and actress
- Robert Six (1907–1986), former CEO of Continental Airlines
- Miriam Snitzer (1922–1966), actress
- Manuel Sorola (1880–1957), first Hispanic FBI agent.
- Jo Stafford (1917–2008), singer
- Harry Stradling (1901–1970), cinematographer
- Edmund Sylvers (1957–2004), singer

=== T ===
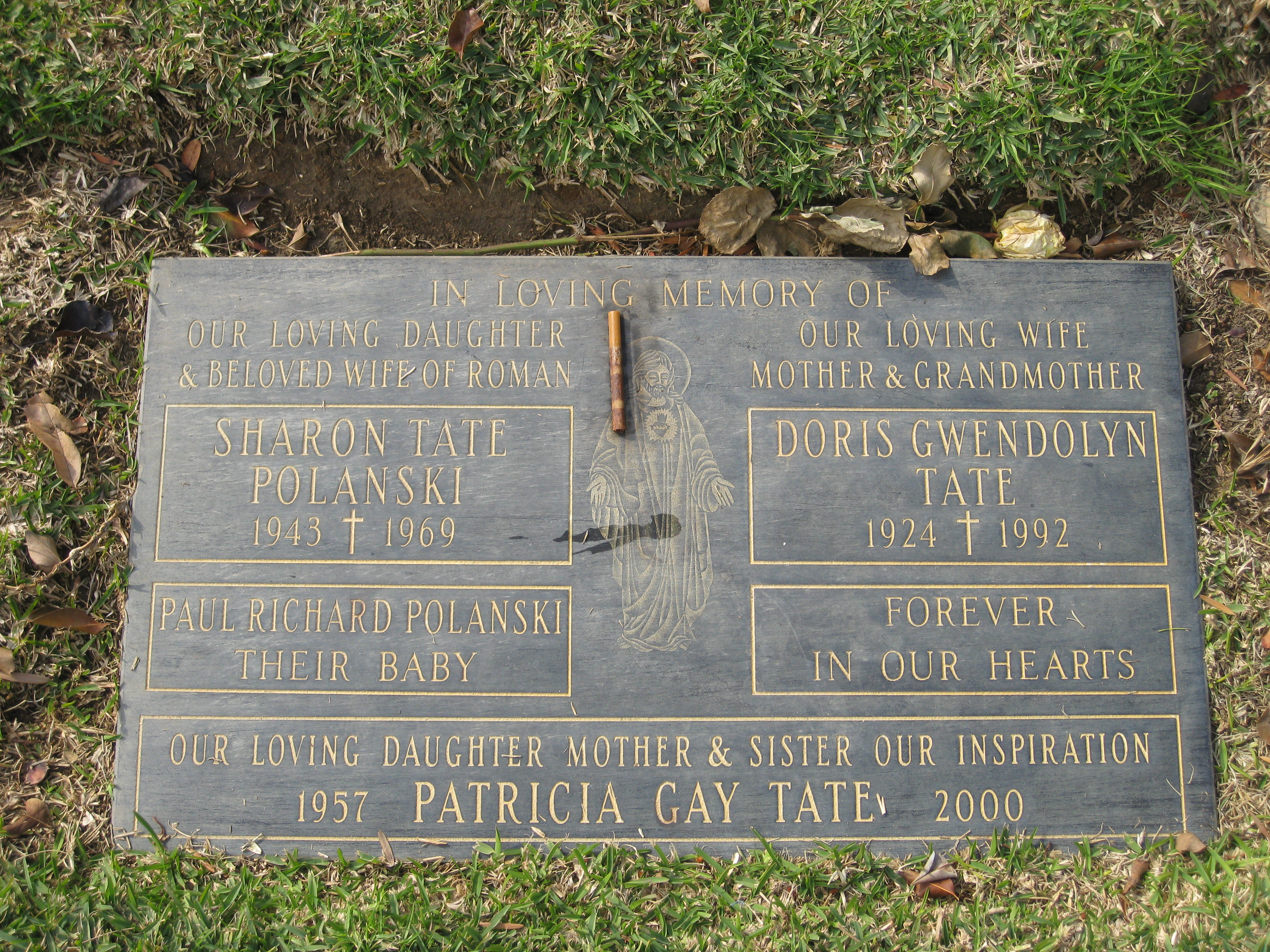
Grave of Doris and Sharon Tate

- Doris Tate (1924–1992), anti-parole activist, mother of Sharon Tate
- Sharon Tate (1943–1969), actress murdered by the Manson family, along with her unborn son Paul Richard Polanski
- Dallas Taylor (1948–2015), drummer
- Ray Teal (1902–1976), actor
- Dewey Terry (1938–2003), musician
- George Trafton (1896–1971), NFL player

=== V ===
- Joseph Valentine (1900–1949), cinematographer
- Mabel Van Buren (1878–1947), actress
- Gloria Morgan Vanderbilt (1904–1965), socialite, twin sister of Thelma Morgan, mother of fashion designer Gloria Vanderbilt
- Joe Viterelli (1937–2004), actor

=== W ===
- Geraldine Wall (1912–1970), actress
- Robert Warwick (1878–1964), actor
- Bryant Washburn (1889–1963), actor
- Ned Washington (1901–1976), songwriter
- Bernie Wayne (1919–1993), songwriter
- Lawrence Welk (1903–1992), musician
- Paul Weston (1912–1996), bandleader, arranger and composer
- Tim Whelan (1893–1957), director and screenwriter
- William R. Wilkerson (1890–1962), founder of The Hollywood Reporter, Flamingo Hotel and owner of such nightclubs as Ciro's
- Mary Wilson (1944–2021), singer; founding member of The Supremes
- Paula Winslowe (1910–1996), actress
- Jack Wrather (1918–1984), investor

=== Y ===
- Georgiana Young (1923–2007), actress
- Loretta Young (1913–2000), actress
- Polly Ann Young (1908–1997), actress

== See also ==
- Holy Cross Cemetery, Colma
