= Mia and Roman =

Documentary film

Mia and Roman is a 1968 23-minute documentary film which was shot during the making of Rosemary's Baby. The title refers to Mia Farrow and Roman Polanski.

The film features footage of Roman Polanski directing the film's cast on set. It was directed by Shahrokh Hatami, an Iranian photographer who befriended Polanski and his wife Sharon Tate.

It was screened as a promo film at Hollywood's Lytton Center, and later included as a featurette on the DVD of Rosemary's Baby.

It is described as a "trippy on-set featurette" and "an odd little bit of cheese".
