= Victim impact statement =

Part of the sentencing process in criminal law

A victim impact statement is a written or oral statement made as part of the judicial legal process, which allows crime victims the opportunity to speak during the sentencing of the convicted person or at subsequent parole hearings.

== Overview ==
One purpose of the statement is to allow the person or persons most directly affected by the crime to address the court during the decision making process. It is seen to personalize the crime and elevate the status of the victim. From the victim's point of view it is regarded as valuable in aiding their emotional recovery from their ordeal. It has also been suggested they may confront an offender with the results of their crime and thus aid rehabilitation.

Another purpose of the statement is to inform a court of the harm suffered by the victim if the court is required to, or has the option of, having regard to the harm suffered by the victim in deciding the sentence.

In cases of crimes resulting in death, the right to speak is extended to family members, friends and colleagues of the deceased. In some jurisdictions there are very different rules on how victim impact statements from family members may be regarded. This is because it is seen as unprincipled that different punishments for death are given according to the how much the victim is missed, or conversely that someone's death is relatively less harmful if they have no family. In the circumstance of death, some jurisdictions have described victim impact statements from family members as "irrelevant" to sentencing but not "unimportant" to the process: they are valued for restorative purposes but cannot differentiate punishment for causing death.

In general terms, the person making the statement is allowed to discuss specifically the direct harm or trauma they have suffered and problems that have resulted from the crime, such as loss of income. Some jurisdictions allow for attaching medical and psychiatric reports that demonstrate harm to the victim. They can also discuss the impact the crime has had on their ambitions or plans for the future, and how this also impacted their extended family.

Some jurisdictions permit statements to express what they deem to be an appropriate punishment or sentence for the criminal. Others expressly forbid any proposal or suggestion on punishment or sentencing. Among other reasons, this is because the sentencing process is solely the domain of the judge who considers many more factors than harm to victims. Allowing suggestions on punishment or sentence can create a false hope of the eventual sentence and undermine the notion of restorative justice.

In civil cases, a victim impact statement may be used to determine how much is awarded to the plaintiff.

== United States ==
The first such statement in the United States was presented in 1976 in Fresno, California, and was passed as law in California in 1982, because of Doris Tate's concern that any members of the Manson family cult that killed her daughter, Sharon Tate, in 1969 might obtain parole.

In 1982, the Final Report of the President's Task Force on Victims of Crime recommended that "judges allow for, and give appropriate weight to, input at sentencing from victims of violent crime." In 1992, the United States Attorney General released 24 recommendations to strengthen the criminal justice system's treatment of crime victims. The Attorney General endorsed the use of victim impact statements and stated that judges should "provide for hearing and considering the victims' perspective at sentencing and at any early release proceedings."

In 1991, the Supreme Court of the United States held that a victim impact statement in the form of testimony was allowed during the sentencing phase of a trial in Payne v. Tennessee 501 U.S. 808 (1991). It ruled that the admission of such statements did not violate the Constitution and that the statements could be ruled as admissible in death penalty cases.

All fifty states allow some sort of victim impact statement at sentencing. However, laws vary by state. For example, there are variations by what topics victims can cover, if they may be read or submitted as a written document, who can submit them, if a victim can be cross-examined after reading a statement, or if it is permissible to videotape the victim impact statement.

== United Kingdom ==
In the United Kingdom, the statement is known as a Victim Personal Statement (VPS). For crimes that affect businesses, it is called an Impact Statement for Business (ISB). The VPS was introduced in England and Wales in 1996 under the Victim's Charter. Evidence shows that it has been inconsistently applied at the sentencing stage with less than half of victims being given the opportunity to provide such a statement.

== Australia ==
The State of South Australia enacted law in 1988 specifically providing for Victim Impact Statements in the sentencing process, and other States followed with legislation that either provides specifically or generally for the tendering of victim impact statements as part of the sentencing process.

Among current issues with victim impact statements is their relative newness and a lack of research into their actual effectiveness against their theoretical goals. There are occasionally legal issues surrounding the admissibility of facts in a victim impact statement that are materially adverse to an offender.

In the State of Queensland, the Director of Public Prosecution guidelines require prosecutors to remove inappropriate or inflammatory material from Victim Impact Statements prior to them being submitted before a court to prevent any such issues.

== Finland ==
In Finland, the victim has a right to recommend a punishment different from the one recommended by the prosecution.

== See also ==
- Victimology
- Victim Support
