= Straky =

- Municipality
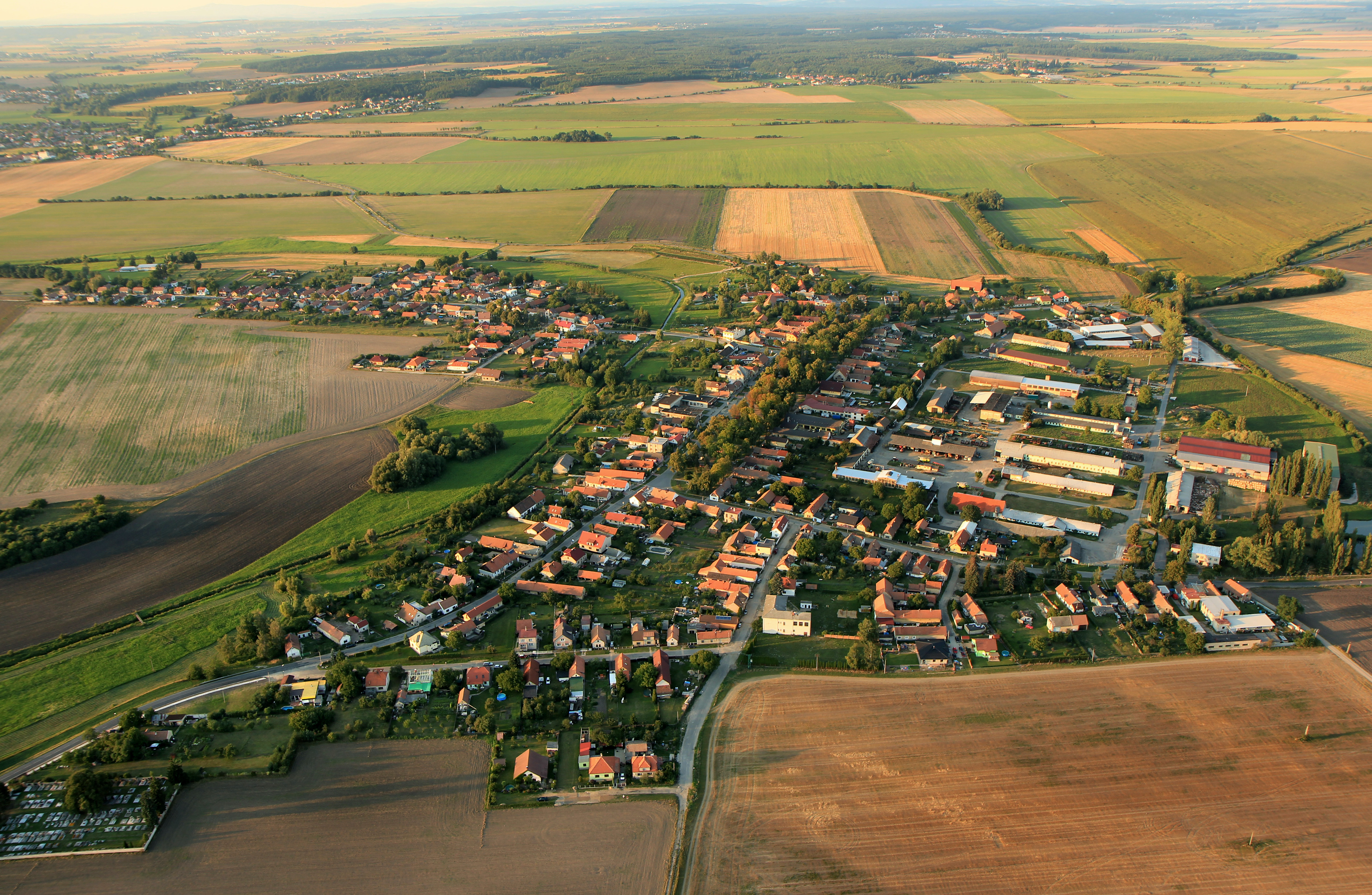
- Aerial view

- Location in the Czech Republic
- Coordinates: 50°14′1″N 14°57′34″E
- Country: Czech Republic
- Region: Central Bohemian
- District: Nymburk
- First mentioned: 1323

Area
  - Total: 9.24 km^{2} (3.57 sq mi)
- Elevation: 196 m (643 ft)

Population (2026-01-01)
  - Total: 529
  - Density: 57.3/km^{2} (148/sq mi)
- Time zone: UTC+1 (CET)
  - Summer (DST): UTC+2 (CEST)
- Postal code: 289 25
- Website: www.straky.eu

Straky is a municipality and village in Nymburk District in the Central Bohemian Region of the Czech Republic. It has about 500 inhabitants.

== Etymology ==
The name is a plural of the personal name Straka, meaning "the village of Strakas (Straka's family)".

== Geography ==
Straky is located about 7 kilometres (4 mi) northwest of Nymburk and 33 km (21 mi) northeast of Prague. It lies in a flat agricultural landscape in the Central Elbe Table. The Vlkava River flows through the municipality.

== History ==
The first written mention of Straky is from 1323. In the 14th century, the village belonged to the Benátky estate, but soon it became part of the Loučeň estate, which lasted until the establishment of an independent municipality in 1848.

== Demographics ==
Historical population

Year	Pop.	±%
1869	708	—
1880	794	+12.1%
1890	810	+2.0%
1900	838	+3.5%
1910	865	+3.2%

Year	Pop.	±%
1921	851	−1.6%
1930	891	+4.7%
1950	743	−16.6%
1961	793	+6.7%
1970	713	−10.1%

Year	Pop.	±%
1980	642	−10.0%
1991	519	−19.2%
2001	517	−0.4%
2011	555	+7.4%
2021	541	−2.5%

Source: Censuses

== Transport ==
There are no major roads passing through the municipality. The railway Mladá Boleslav–Nymburk crosses the municipal territory in the east, but there is no train station.

== Sights ==
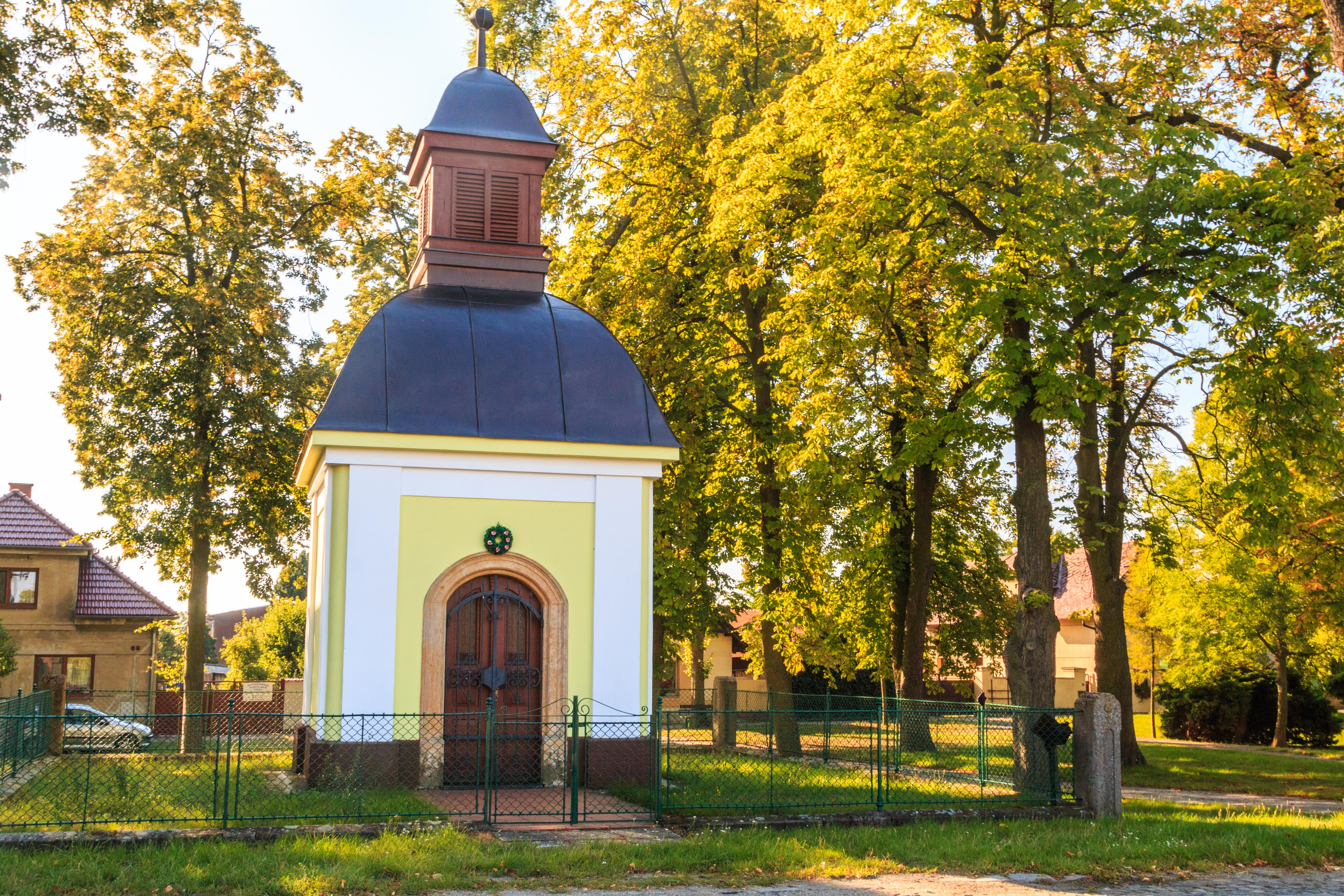
Chapel of Saint John the Baptist

There are no protected cultural monuments in the municipality.

The main landmark of Straky is the Chapel of Saint John the Baptist. It is not known when it was built. It was renovated to its present form in 1868–1874.
