= Sharon Tate =

American actress and model (1943–1969)

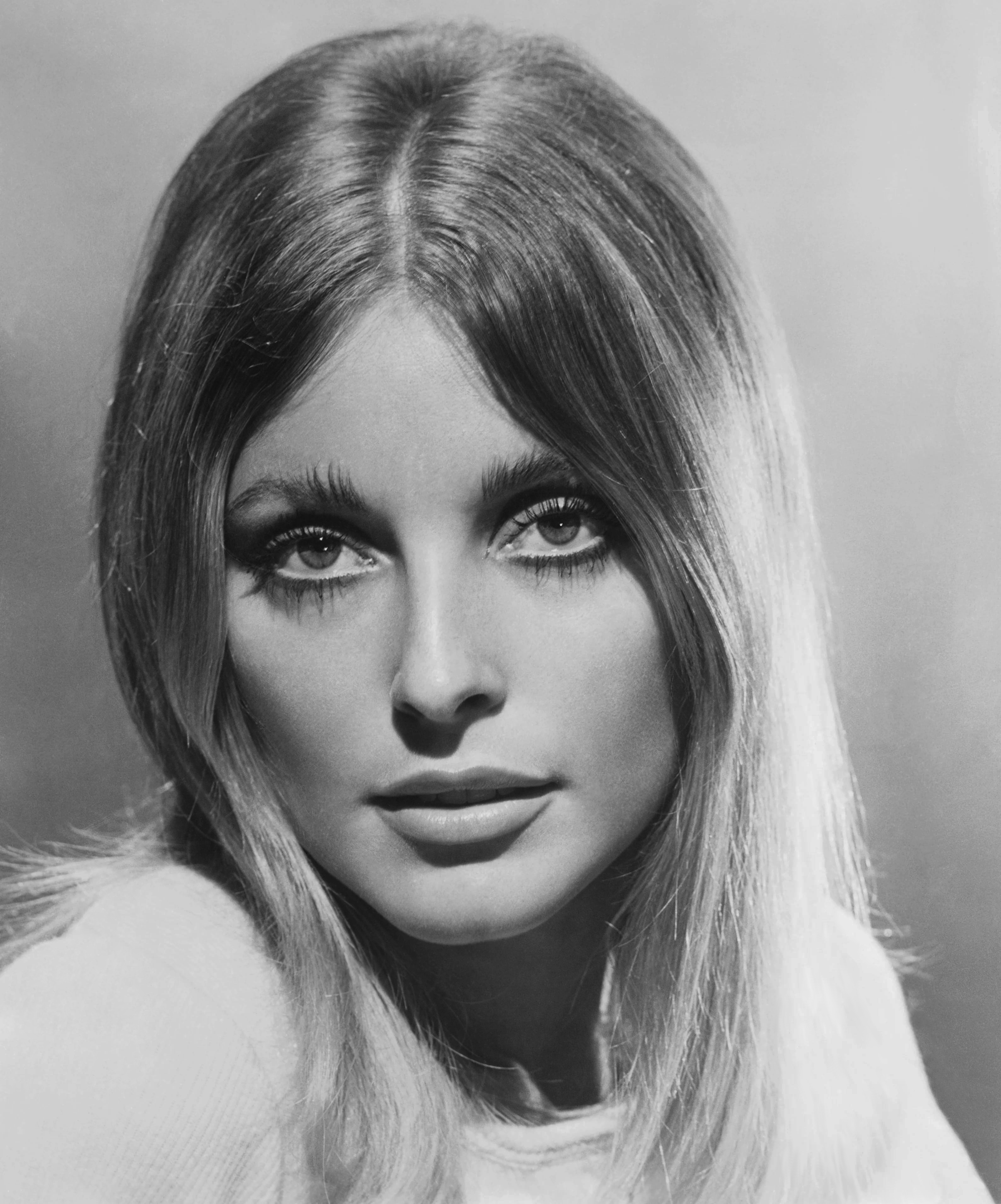
- Tate in 1967
- Born: Sharon Marie Tate; January 24, 1943; Dallas, Texas, U.S.
- Died: August 9, 1969 (aged 26); Los Angeles, California, U.S.
- Cause of death: Sharp force trauma
- Burial place: Holy Cross Cemetery, Culver City
- Other name: Sharon Tate Polanski
- Occupations: Actress; model
- Years active: 1961–1969
- Known for: Valley of the Dolls (film)
- Height: 5 ft 6 in (168 cm)
- Spouse: Roman Polanski (m. 1968)
- Children: 1 (Note: Unborn)
- Mother: Doris Tate
- Website: www.sharontate.net/index.html

Sharon Marie Tate Polanski (January 24, 1943 – August 9, 1969) was an American actress and model. During the 1960s, she appeared in advertisements and small television roles before appearing in films as well as working as a model. After receiving positive reviews for her comedic and dramatic acting performances, Tate was hailed as one of Hollywood's most promising newcomers, being compared favorably with Marilyn Monroe.

She made her film debut in 1961 as an extra in Barabbas with Anthony Quinn. She next appeared in the British mystery horror film Eye of the Devil (1966) and co-starred in the 1967 film Don't Make Waves. Her first major role was as Jennifer North in the 1967 American drama film Valley of the Dolls, which earned her a Golden Globe Award nomination. The role would help her to become a rising sex symbol of Hollywood, appearing in a Playboy photoshoot by filmmaker Roman Polanski, whom she went on to marry. That year, she also performed in the comedy horror film The Fearless Vampire Killers, directed by Polanski. Tate's last completed film, 12+1, was released posthumously in 1969.

On August 9, 1969, Tate and four others were murdered by members of the Manson Family, a cult, in the home she shared with Polanski, while he was away. She was eight-and-a-half months pregnant.

== Biography ==
=== 1943–1964: Childhood and early acting career ===
Sharon Marie Tate was born on January 24, 1943, in Dallas, Texas, the eldest of three daughters to Colonel Paul James Tate, a United States Army intelligence officer, and his wife, Doris Gwendolyn (née Willett). At six months of age, Tate won the "Miss Tiny Tot of Dallas Pageant", but her parents had no show business ambitions for their daughter. Paul Tate was promoted and transferred several times. By the age of 16, Tate had lived in six cities and reportedly found it difficult to maintain friendships. Her family described her as shy and lacking in self-confidence. But even with lacking confidence, her later on classmates said she dated the most "baddest/ coolest jocks" in school and often got chosen as Prom Queen. Yet as an adult, Tate commented that people would misinterpret her shyness as aloofness until they knew her better.

Tate attended South Shaver Elementary School in Pasadena, Texas, through 1955, Chief Joseph Junior High School (later a middle school) from September 1955 to June 1958, and Columbia High School in Richland, Washington, from September 1958 to October 1959. In El Paso, Texas, she attended Irvin High School from late fall 1959 to April 1960 and then Vicenza American High School in Vicenza, Italy, from April 1960 to graduation in June 1961.

As she matured, people commented on Tate's appearance; she began entering beauty pageants, winning the title of "Miss Richland" in Washington in 1959 at age sixteen. She spoke of her ambition to study psychiatry and her intention to compete in the "Miss Washington" pageant in 1960; however, before she could do either, her father was transferred to Italy. With her family relocating to Verona, Tate learned that she had become a local celebrity owing to the publication of a photograph of her in a swimsuit on the cover of the military newspaper Stars and Stripes. She discovered a kinship with other students at the American school she attended in nearby Vicenza, recognizing that their backgrounds and feelings of separation were similar to her own, and, for the first time in her life, began to form lasting friendships. While in Italy, when on a date with a soldier, she was raped by him, and after she didn't tell her parents nor authorities and she was quiet about what happened for the rest of her life. She confided in Polanski about what happened on their first date, which he said that "it hadn't left her emotionally scarred."

Tate and her friends became interested in the filming of Hemingway's Adventures of a Young Man, which was being made nearby with Paul Newman, Susan Strasberg and Richard Beymer, and obtained parts as film extras. Beymer noticed Tate in the crowd and introduced himself, and the two dated during the production of the film, with Beymer encouraging Tate to pursue a film career. In 1960, Tate was employed by the singer Pat Boone and appeared with him in an episode of the television series The Pat Boone Chevy Showroom which was filmed in Venice.

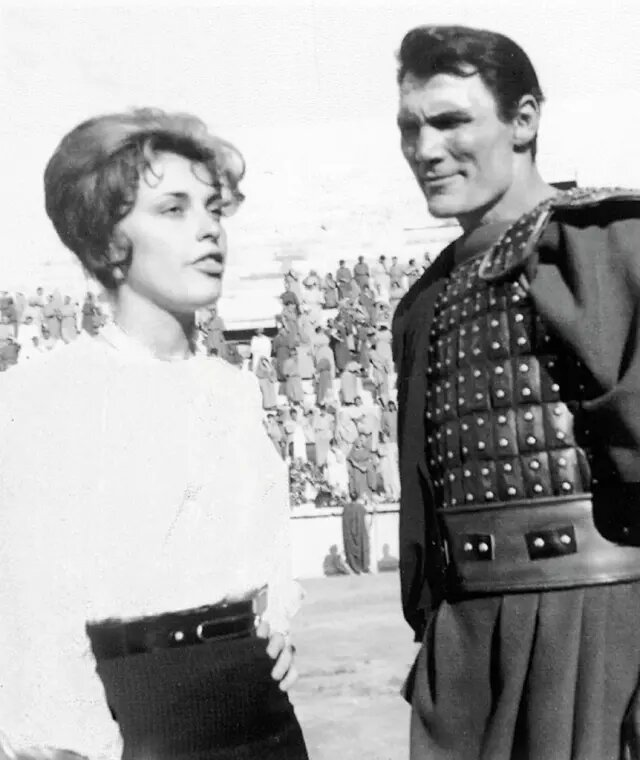
Tate with Jack Palance during the filming of Barabbas (1961)

Later that year, when Barabbas was being filmed near Verona, Tate was again hired as an extra. Actor Jack Palance was impressed by her appearance and attitude, although her role was too small to judge her talent. He arranged a screen test for her in Rome, but this did not lead to further work. Tate returned to the United States alone, saying that she wanted to further her studies, but tried to find film work. After a few months, Doris Tate, her concerned mother, suffered a nervous breakdown and her daughter was persuaded to return to Italy.

The family returned to the United States in 1962 and Tate moved to Los Angeles, where she contacted Richard Beymer's agent, Harold Gefsky. After their first meeting, Gefsky agreed to represent her, and secured work for her in television and magazine advertisements. In 1963, he introduced her to Martin Ransohoff, director of Filmways, Inc., who signed her to a seven-year contract. She was considered for the role of Billie Jo Bradley on CBS's sitcom Petticoat Junction, but Ransohoff believed that she lacked confidence and the role was given to Jeannine Riley. Ransohoff gave Tate small parts in Mister Ed and The Beverly Hillbillies to help her gain experience, but was unwilling to allow her to play a more substantial role. "Mr. Ransohoff didn't want the audience to see me till I was ready", Tate was quoted in a 1967 article in Playboy.

During this time, Tate met the French actor Philippe Forquet and began a relationship with him in 1963. They became engaged, but their relationship was volatile and they frequently argued. Career pressures drove them apart and they broke up the next year in 1964.

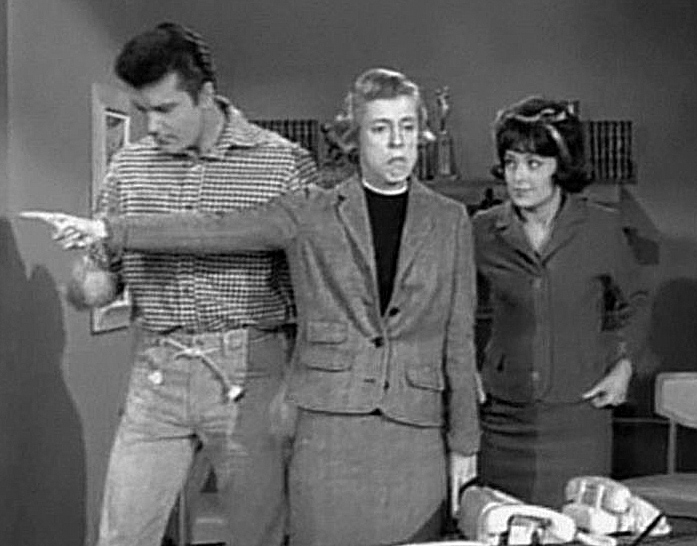
Tate (right, wearing a dark wig) in the 1964 "Giant Jackrabbit" episode of The Beverly Hillbillies with Max Baer, Jr. and Nancy Kulp

In 1964, she met Jay Sebring, a former sailor who had established himself as a leading hair stylist in Hollywood. Tate later said that Sebring's nature was especially gentle but, when he proposed marriage, she declined. She said that she would retire from acting as soon as she married and, at that time, she intended to focus on her career.

=== 1964–1967: Hollywood recognition and Valley of the Dolls ===
In 1964, Tate made a screen test for Sam Peckinpah opposite Steve McQueen for the film The Cincinnati Kid. Ransohoff and Peckinpah agreed that Tate's timidity and lack of experience would cause her to flounder in such a large part, and she was rejected in favor of Tuesday Weld. She continued to gain experience with minor television appearances and, after she auditioned unsuccessfully for the role of Liesl in the film version of The Sound of Music, Ransohoff gave Tate walk-on roles in two motion pictures in which he was the producer: The Americanization of Emily and The Sandpiper. In late 1965, Ransohoff finally gave Tate her first major role in a motion picture in the film Eye of the Devil, costarring David Niven, Deborah Kerr, Donald Pleasence and David Hemmings.

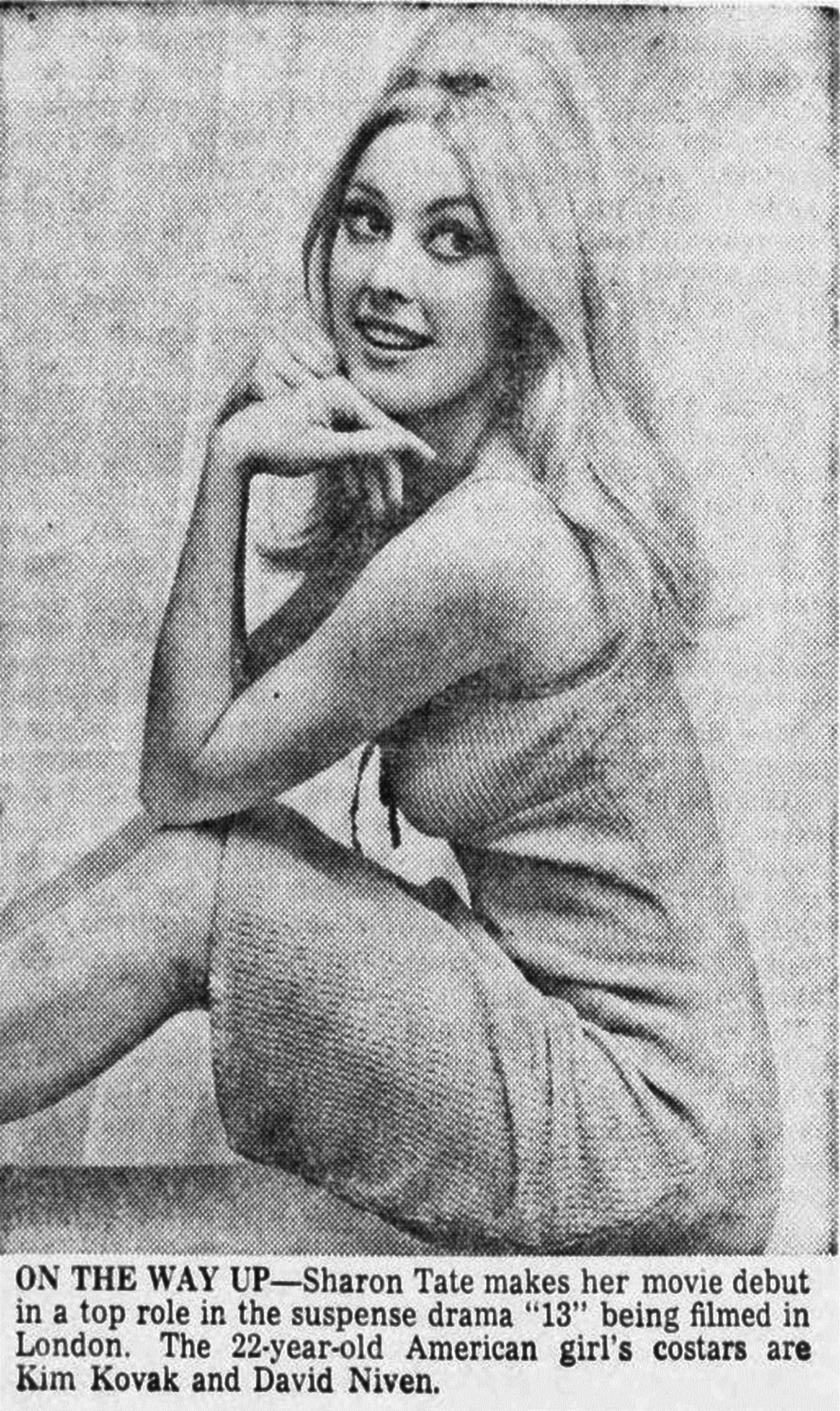
Newspaper clipping, November 28, 1965

Tate and Sebring traveled to London to prepare for filming, where she met the Alexandrian Wiccan High Priest and High Priestess Alex and Maxine Sanders. Meanwhile, as part of Ransohoff's promotion of Tate, he arranged the production of a short documentary called All Eyes on Sharon Tate, to be released at the same time as Eye of the Devil. It included an interview with Eye of the Devil director J. Lee Thompson, who expressed his initial doubts about Tate's potential with the comment, "We even agreed that if after the first two weeks Sharon was not quite making it, we would put her back in cold storage", but added that he soon realized Tate was "tremendously exciting".

Tate played Odile, a witch who exerts a mysterious power over a landowner, played by Niven, and his wife, played by Kerr. Although she did not have as many lines as the other actors, Tate's performance was considered crucial to the film, and she was required, more than the other cast members, to set an ethereal tone. Niven described her as a "great discovery", and Kerr said that, with "a reasonable amount of luck", Tate would be a great success. In interviews, Tate commented on her good fortune in working with such professionals in her first film and said that she had learned a lot about acting simply by watching Kerr at work. Much of the filming took place in France, and Sebring returned to Los Angeles to fulfill his business obligations. After filming, Tate remained in London, where she immersed herself in the fashion world and nightclubs. Around this time, she met Roman Polanski.

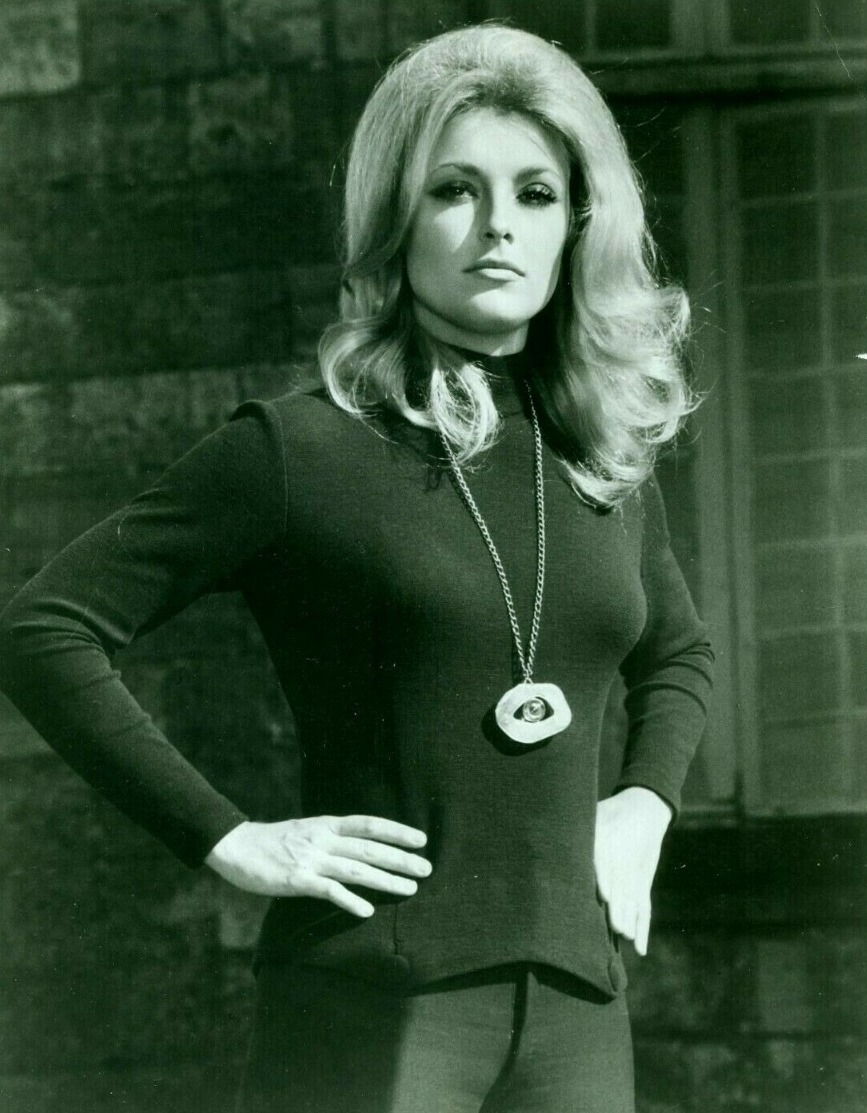
Tate in a publicity photograph for Eye of the Devil (1966)

Tate and Polanski later agreed that neither of them had been impressed by the other when they first met. Polanski was planning The Fearless Vampire Killers, which was being coproduced by Ransohoff, and had decided that he wanted the red-headed actress Jill St. John for the female lead. Ransohoff insisted that Polanski cast Tate and, after meeting with her, Polanski agreed that she would be suitable on the condition that she wore a red wig during filming. The company traveled to Italy for filming, where Tate's fluent Italian proved useful in communicating with the local crew members. A perfectionist, Polanski had little patience with the inexperienced Tate and said in an interview that one scene had required 70 takes before he was satisfied. In addition to directing, Polanski also played one of the main characters, a guileless young man who is intrigued by Tate's character and begins a romance with her. As filming progressed, Polanski praised her performances and her confidence grew. They began a relationship and Tate moved into Polanski's London apartment after filming ended. Jay Sebring traveled to London, where he insisted on meeting Polanski. Although friends later said he was devastated, he befriended Polanski and remained Tate's closest confidant. Polanski later commented that Sebring was a lonely and isolated person, who viewed Tate and himself as his family.

Tate returned to the United States to film Don't Make Waves with Tony Curtis, leaving Polanski in London. Tate played the role of Malibu and the film was intended to capitalize on the popularity of beach movies at the time, as well as the music of such artists as the Beach Boys and Jan and Dean. Tate's character, billed by Metro-Goldwyn-Mayer publicity as "Malibu, Queen of the Surf", wore little more than a bikini for most of the film. Disappointed with the film, she began sarcastically referring to herself as "sexy little me". Before the film's release, Tate featured in a major publishing campaign for Coppertone sunscreen. The film opened to poor reviews and mediocre ticket sales, and Tate was quoted as confiding to a reporter, "It's a terrible movie", before adding, "Sometimes I say things I shouldn't. I guess I'm too outspoken."

Polanski returned to the United States and was contracted by the head of Paramount Pictures, Robert Evans, to direct and write the screenplay for Rosemary's Baby, which was based on Ira Levin's novel of the same name. Polanski later admitted that he had wanted Tate to star in the film and had hoped that someone would suggest her, as he felt it inappropriate to make the suggestion himself. The producers did not suggest Tate, and Mia Farrow was cast. A frequent visitor to the set, Tate was photographed there by Esquire and the resulting photographs generated considerable publicity for both Tate and the film. A March 1967 article about Tate in Playboy began, "This is the year that Sharon Tate happens ..." and included six nude or partially nude photographs taken by Roman Polanski during filming of The Fearless Vampire Killers. Tate was optimistic: Eye of the Devil and The Fearless Vampire Killers were each due for release.

She had been cast to play a major role in the screenplay of Valley of the Dolls. One of the bestselling novels in modern history, the film version was highly publicized and anticipated. While Tate acknowledged that such a prominent role should further her career, she confided to Polanski how she did not like either the book or the script. Patty Duke, Barbara Parkins and Judy Garland were cast as the other leads. Susan Hayward replaced Garland after the latter's substance abuse became a problem during early filming. Director Mark Robson was highly critical of the three principal actresses but, according to Duke, directed most of his criticism at Tate. Duke later said that Robson "continually treated [Tate] like an imbecile, which she definitely was not, and she was very attuned and sensitive to this treatment". Polanski later quoted Robson as saying to him, "That's a great girl you're living with. Few actresses have her kind of vulnerability. She's got a great future."

In interviews during production, Tate expressed an affinity for her character, Jennifer North, an aspiring actress admired only for her body. Some magazines commented that Tate was viewed similarly and Look published an unfavorable article about the three lead actresses, describing Tate as "a hopelessly stupid and vain starlet". Tate, Duke and Parkins developed a close friendship that continued after the completion of the film. During the shooting of Valley of the Dolls, Tate confided to Parkins that she was "madly in love" with Polanski. "Yes, there's no doubt that Roman is the man in my life", Tate was quoted as saying in the New York Sunday News. Tate promoted the film enthusiastically. She frequently commented on her admiration for Lee Grant, with whom she had played several dramatic scenes. Tate was quoted as saying, "I learned a great deal about acting in [Valley of the Dolls], particularly in my scenes with Lee Grant.... She knows what acting is all about and everything she does, from little mannerisms to delivering her lines, is pure professionalism."

A journalist asked Tate to comment on her nude scene, and she replied,

I have no qualms about it at all. I don't see any difference between being stark naked or fully dressed — if it's part of the job and it's done with meaning and intention. I honestly don't understand the big fuss made over nudity and sex in films. It's silly. On TV, the children can watch people murdering each other, which is a very unnatural thing, but they can't watch two people in the very natural process of making love. Now, really, that doesn't make any sense, does it?

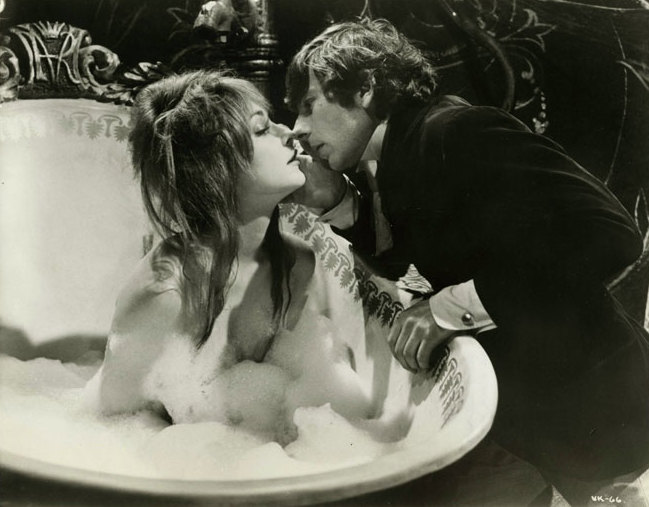
Tate kissing Roman Polanski in The Fearless Vampire Killers (1967)

An edited version of The Fearless Vampire Killers was released, and Polanski expressed disgust at Ransohoff for "butchering" his film. Newsweek called it "a witless travesty", and it was not profitable. Tate's performance was largely ignored in reviews and, when she was mentioned, it was usually in relation to her nude scenes. Eye of the Devil was released shortly after, and Metro-Goldwyn-Mayer attempted to build interest in Tate with its press release describing her as "one of the screen's most exciting new personalities". The film failed to find an audience and most reviews were indifferent, neither praising nor condemning it. The New York Times wrote that one of the few highlights was Tate's "chillingly beautiful but expressionless performance".

The All Eyes on Sharon Tate documentary was used to publicize the film. Its 14 minutes consisted of a number of scenes depicting Tate filming Eye of the Devil, dancing in nightclubs, and sightseeing around London, and also contained a brief interview with her. Asked about her acting ambitions, she replied, "I don't fool myself. I can't see myself doing Shakespeare." She spoke of her hopes of finding a niche in comedy and, in other interviews, she expressed her desire to become "a light comedienne in the Carole Lombard style".

Later in the year, Valley of the Dolls opened to almost uniformly negative reviews. Bosley Crowther wrote in The New York Times, "all a fairly respectful admirer of movies can do is laugh at it and turn away". Newsweek said that the film "has no more sense of its own ludicrousness than a village idiot stumbling in manure", but a later article read: "Astoundingly photogenic, infinitely curvaceous, Sharon Tate is one of the most smashing young things to hit Hollywood in a long time." The three lead actresses were castigated in numerous publications, including The Saturday Review, which wrote, "Ten years ago ... Parkins, Duke, and Tate would more likely have been playing the hat check girls than movie-queens; they are totally lacking in style, authority, or charm." The Hollywood Reporter provided some positive comments, such as, "Sharon Tate emerges as the film's most sympathetic character ... William H. Daniels' photographic caress of her faultless face and enormous absorbent eyes is stunning." Roger Ebert of the Chicago Sun-Times praised Tate as "a wonder to behold" but, after describing the dialogue in one scene as "the most offensive and appalling vulgarity ever thrown up by any civilization", concluded that, "I will be unable to take her any more seriously as a sex symbol than Raquel Welch."

=== 1968–1969: Marriage to Roman Polanski and final films ===
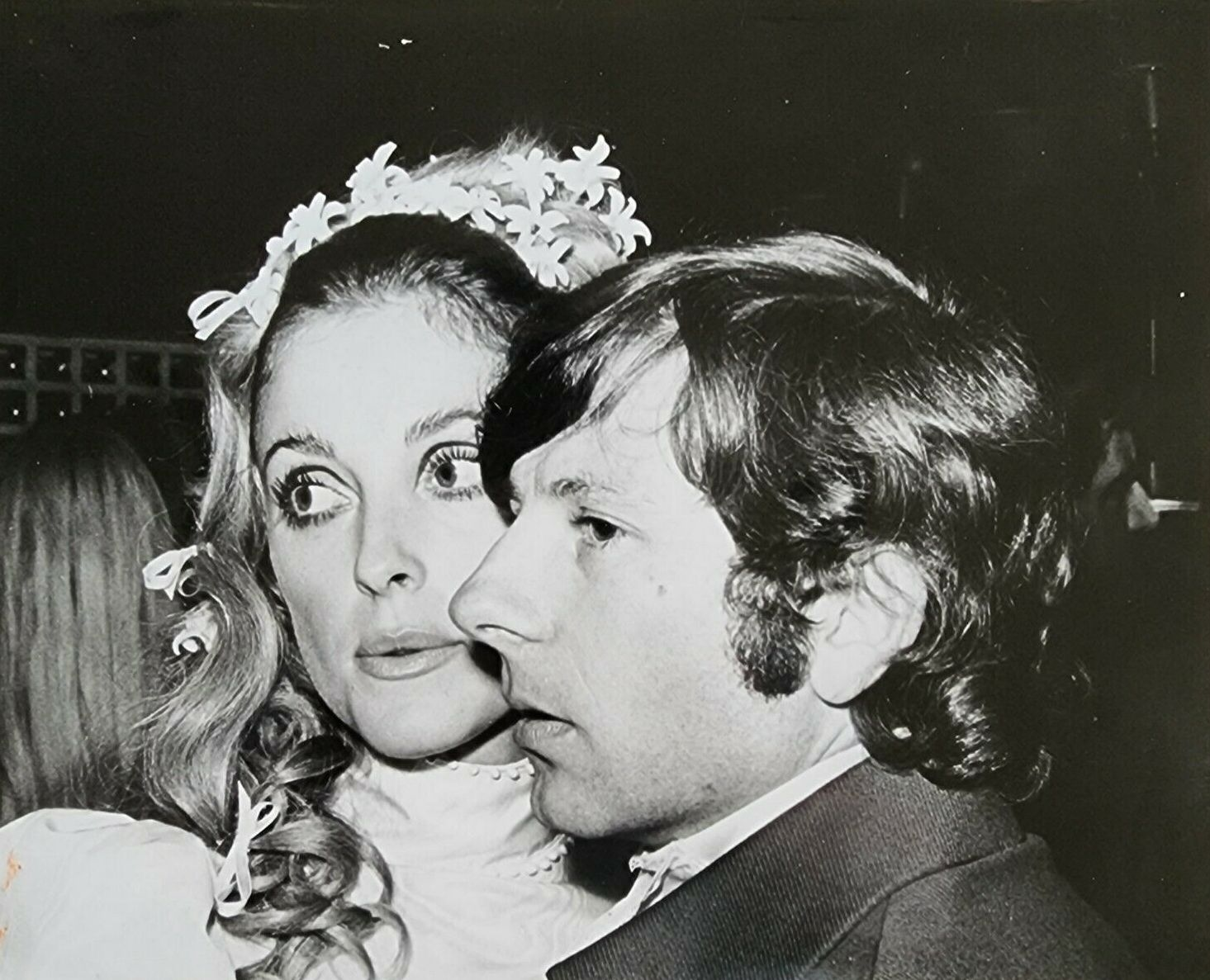
Tate and Polanski at their wedding in 1968

In late 1967, Tate and Polanski returned to London and were frequent subjects of newspaper and magazine articles. She was depicted as being untraditional and modern, and was quoted as saying that couples should live together before marrying. They were married in Chelsea, London, on January 20, 1968 (four days before Tate's 25th birthday), with considerable publicity. Polanski was dressed in "Edwardian finery" while Tate was attired in an off-white taffeta minidress. The couple moved into Polanski's mews house off Eaton Square in Belgravia, London.

Photographer Peter Evans described them as "the imperfect couple. They were the Douglas Fairbanks/Mary Pickford of our time…. Cool, nomadic, talented, and nicely shocking." Tate reportedly wanted a traditional marriage but Polanski remained promiscuous and described her attitude to his infidelity as "Sharon's big hang-up". He reminded her that she had promised not to change him. Tate accepted his conditions, though she confided to friends that she hoped that he would change. Peter Evans quoted Tate as saying, "We have a good arrangement. Roman lies to me and I pretend to believe him."

Polanski urged Tate to end her association with Martin Ransohoff, and she began to place less importance on her career until Polanski told her that he wanted to be married to "a hippie, not a housewife". The couple returned to Los Angeles and quickly became part of a social group that included some of the most successful young people in the film industry, including Warren Beatty, Jacqueline Bisset, Leslie Caron, Joan Collins, Mia Farrow, Jane Fonda, Peter Fonda, Laurence Harvey, Steve McQueen, Joanna Pettet and Peter Sellers; older film stars such as Yul Brynner, Kirk Douglas, Henry Fonda and Danny Kaye; musicians such as Jim Morrison and the Mamas & the Papas; and record producer Terry Melcher and his girlfriend Candice Bergen. Jay Sebring remained one of the couple's more frequent companions. Polanski's friends included Wojciech Frykowski, whom Polanski had known since his youth in Poland, and Frykowski's girlfriend Abigail Folger, the coffee heiress. Tate and Polanski moved into the Chateau Marmont in Los Angeles for a few months until they arranged to lease Patty Duke's home on Summit Ridge Drive in Beverly Hills during the latter part of 1968. The Polanski house was often full of strangers, and Tate regarded the casual atmosphere as part of the "free spirit" of the times, saying that she did not mind who came into her home as her motto was "live and let live". Her close friend Leslie Caron commented that the Polanskis were too trusting, "to the point of recklessness", and that she had been alarmed by it.

In the summer of 1968, Tate began work on The Wrecking Crew, a comedy in which she played Freya Carlson, an accident-prone spy who was also a romantic interest for star Dean Martin, playing Matt Helm. She performed her own stunts and was taught martial arts by Bruce Lee. The film was successful and brought Tate strong reviews, with many reviewers praising her comedic performance. The New York Times critic Vincent Canby criticized the film but wrote, "The only nice thing is Sharon Tate, a tall, really great-looking girl." Martin commented that he intended to make another "Matt Helm" film and that he wanted Tate to reprise her role.

Around this time, Tate was feted as a promising newcomer. She was nominated for a Golden Globe Award for New Star of the Year – Actress for her performance in Valley of the Dolls. She was also runner-up to Lynn Redgrave in the Motion Picture Herald's poll for "The Star of Tomorrow", in which box-office drawing power was the main criterion. These results indicated that her career was beginning to accelerate, and she negotiated a fee of $150,000 for her next film.

She became pregnant near the end of 1968, and she and Polanski moved to 10050 Cielo Drive in Benedict Canyon, Los Angeles on February 15, 1969. The house had previously been occupied by their friends Terry Melcher and Candice Bergen. Tate and Polanski had visited it several times, and Tate was thrilled to learn that it was available, referring to it as her "love house". At their new home, the Polanskis continued to be popular hosts for their large group of friends, although some of them still worried about the strange people who continued to show up at their parties. Tate was encouraged by the positive reviews of her comedic performances and chose the comedy The Thirteen Chairs (1969) as her next project, largely for the opportunity to co-star with Orson Welles. In March 1969, she traveled to Italy to begin filming, and Polanski went to London to work on The Day of the Dolphin.

Frykowski and Folger moved into the Cielo Drive house. After completing The Thirteen Chairs, Tate joined Polanski in London. She posed in their apartment for photographer Terry O'Neill in casual domestic scenes such as opening baby gifts, and she completed a series of glamour photographs for the British magazine Queen. She returned from London to Los Angeles on July 20, 1969, on the Queen Elizabeth 2 (by this ship from Southampton, England to New York). Polanski was due to return on August 12 in time for the birth, and he had asked Frykowski and Folger to stay in the house with Tate until his return.

== Murder, funeral and trial ==
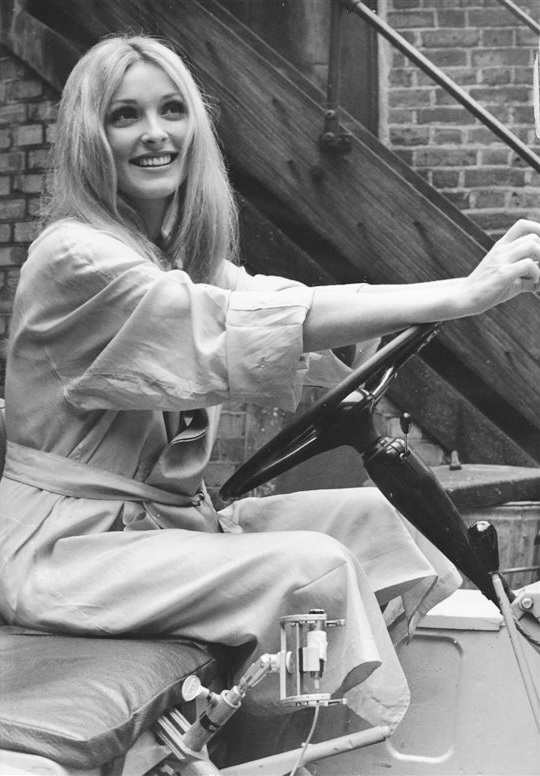
Tate in 1969

On August 8, 1969, Tate entertained actress Joanna Pettet for lunch at her home, confiding in her disappointment at Polanski's delay in returning from London. Polanski telephoned her that day. Her younger sister Debra also called, to ask if she, her boyfriend and another friend could pick up a saddle that Sharon had bought for Debra in Europe. Tate declined, offering to have them over another time. Later that evening, she reportedly dined at El Coyote Cafe with Jay Sebring, Wojciech Frykowski, and Abigail Folger, returning at about 10:30 p.m.

Shortly after midnight, Sebring, Frykowski, Folger, and Tate and her unborn son were murdered by members of the Manson Family cult. Tate was the last of the victims to die, despite her pleas that the Family take her with them so that she could give birth. Their bodies were discovered the following morning by Tate's housekeeper Winifred Chapman. Police arrived at the scene to find a young man shot dead in his car in the driveway, later identified as Steven Parent. Inside the house, the bodies of Tate and Sebring were found with a long rope which had been thrown over a beam and then tied around each of their necks, connecting them. On the front lawn lay the bodies of Frykowski and Folger. All of the victims except Parent had been stabbed numerous times. The coroner's report for Tate noted that she had been stabbed 16 times and that "five of the wounds were in and of themselves fatal". In addition, the coroner's inquest found that Tate was still alive when she was hanged with the rope, but she died immediately from a "massive hemorrhage".

Police took the only survivor at the address – the property's caretaker William Garretson – in for questioning. Garretson lived in the guest house that was located on the property a short distance from the house. He was questioned and submitted to a polygraph test and stated that Parent had visited him at approximately 11:30 p.m. and left shortly after. He told police that he had no involvement in the murders and did not know anything that could help the investigation, and he was subsequently released.

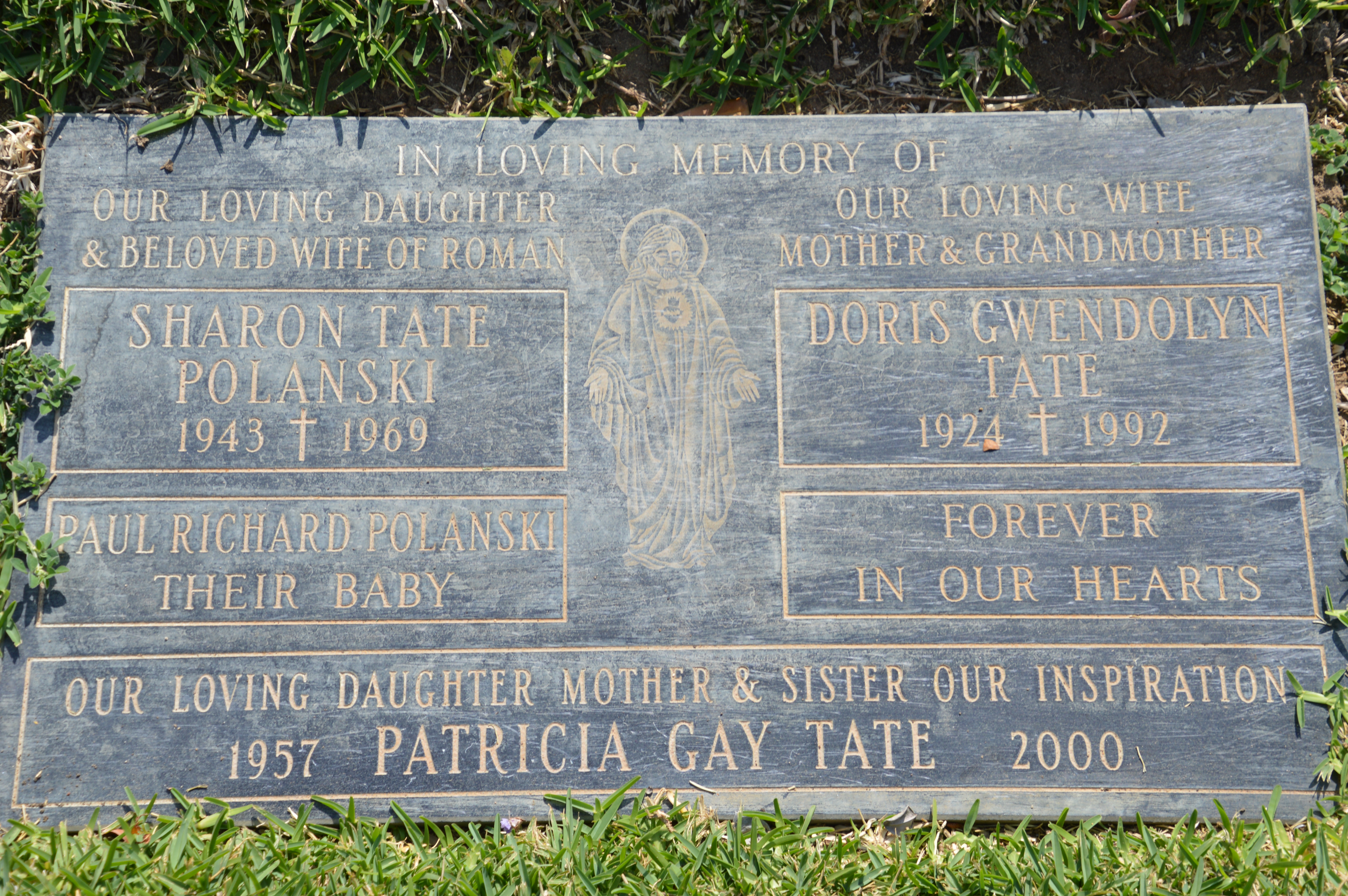
The Tate family burial plot located at Holy Cross Cemetery, Culver City, California, in which Tate, her unborn son Paul, mother Doris, and sister Patti are buried

Polanski was informed of the murders and returned to Los Angeles where police questioned him about his wife and her friends. On Wednesday, August 13, Tate was interred in the Holy Cross Cemetery, Culver City, California, together with her unborn son, who was posthumously named Paul Richard Polanski. Sebring's funeral took place later the same day; the funerals were scheduled several hours apart to allow friends of Tate and Sebring to attend both.

Life devoted a lengthy article to the murders and featured photographs of the crime scenes. Polanski was interviewed for the article and allowed himself to be photographed at the entrance of the house, next to the front door with the word "PIG" still visible, written in Tate's blood. He was widely criticized for the photoshoot but he argued that he wanted to know who was responsible and was willing to shock the magazine's readers in the hope that someone would come forward with information.

Curiosity about the victims led to the re-release of Tate's films, which achieved greater popularity than they had in their initial runs. Some newspapers began to speculate about the motives for the murders. Some published photographs of Tate were alleged to be taken at a Satanic ritual, but were in fact production photographs from Eye of the Devil. Friends spoke out against the portrayal of Tate by some elements of the media. Mia Farrow said that she was as "sweet and pure a human being as I have ever known", while Patty Duke remembered her as "a gentle, gentle creature". Polanski tearfully berated a crowd of journalists at a news conference, asking them, "Did you ever write how good she was?". Polanski said he began to suspect various friends and associates, and his paranoia subsided only when the killers were arrested. Newspapers claimed that many Hollywood stars were moving out of the city, while others installed security systems in their homes. Dominick Dunne recalled the tension:

The shock waves that went through the town were beyond anything I had ever seen before. People were convinced that the rich and famous of the community were in peril. Children were sent out of town. Guards were hired. Steve McQueen packed a gun when he went to Jay Sebring's funeral.

== Legacy ==
In the early 1980s, Stephen Kay, who had worked for the prosecution in the trial, became alarmed that Manson Family member Leslie Van Houten had gathered 900 signatures on a petition for her parole. He contacted Tate's mother, Doris, who said that she was sure she could do better, and the two mounted a publicity campaign, collecting over 350,000 signatures supporting the denial of parole. Although Van Houten had been seen as the most likely of the killers to be paroled, her petition was denied after the efforts of Kay and Tate. Doris Tate became a vocal advocate for victims' rights and, in discussing her daughter's murder and meeting other crime victims, assumed the role of counselor, using her profile to encourage public discussion and criticism of the corrections system.

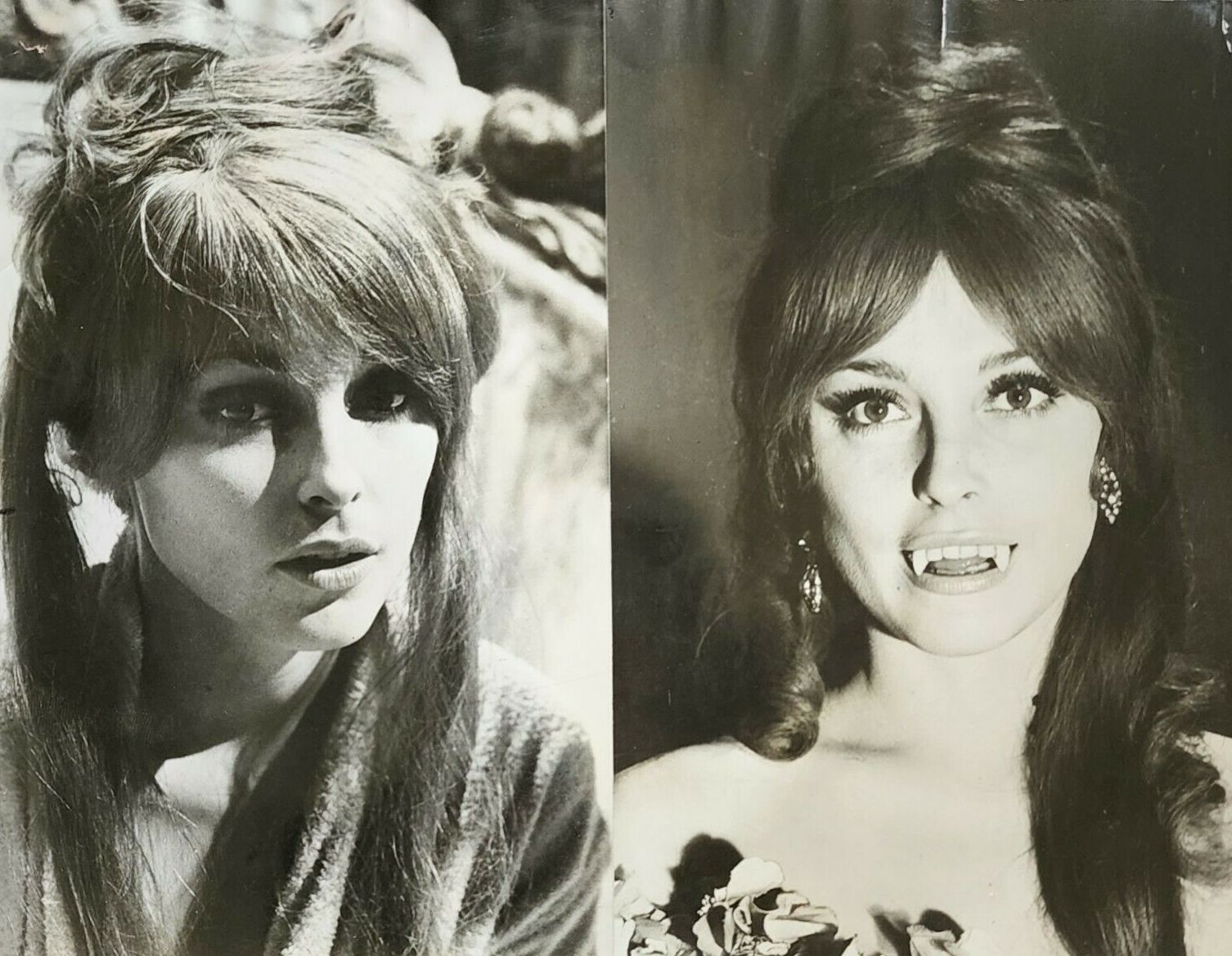
Tate in The Fearless Vampire Killers (1967)

For the rest of her life she strongly campaigned against the parole of each of the Manson killers and worked closely with other victims of violent crime. Several times she confronted Charles "Tex" Watson and Susan Atkins at parole hearings, explaining, "I feel that Sharon has to be represented in that hearing room. If they're [the killers] pleading for their lives then I have to be there representing her." She addressed Tex Watson directly during her victim impact statement in 1990: "What mercy, sir, did you show my daughter when she was begging for her life? What mercy did you show my daughter when she said, 'Give me two weeks to have my baby and then you can kill me'? ... When will Sharon come up for parole? Will these seven victims and possibly more walk out of their graves if you get paroled? You cannot be trusted."

In 1992 President George Bush recognized Doris Tate as one of his "thousand points of light" for her volunteer work on behalf of victims' rights. By this time Doris Tate had been diagnosed with a malignant brain tumor and her health and strength were failing; her meeting with Bush marked her final public appearance. When she died later that year, her youngest daughter, Patricia Gay Tate, known as Patti, continued her work. She contributed to the 1993 foundation of the Doris Tate Crime Victims Bureau, a nonprofit organization that aims to influence crime legislation throughout the United States and to give greater rights and protection to victims of violent crime. In 1995, the Doris Tate Crime Victims Foundation was founded as a nonprofit organization to promote public awareness of the judicial system and to provide support to the victims of violent crime.

Patti Tate confronted David Geffen and board members of Geffen Records in 1993 over plans to include a song written by Charles Manson on the Guns N' Roses album "The Spaghetti Incident?" She commented to a journalist that the record company was "putting Manson up on a pedestal for young people who don't know who he is to worship like an idol".

After Patti's death from breast cancer in 2000 her older sister Debra continued to represent the Tate family at parole hearings. Debra Tate said of the killers: "They don't show any personal responsibility. They haven't made atonement to any one of my family members." She has also unsuccessfully lobbied for her sister to be awarded a star on the Hollywood Walk of Fame.

Colonel Paul Tate preferred not to make public comments; however he was a constant presence during the murder trial and in the following years attended parole hearings with his wife and wrote letters to authorities in which he strongly opposed any suggestion of parole. He died in May 2005.

Tate in Eye of the Devil (1966)
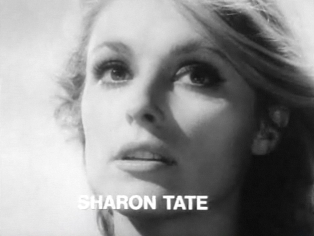
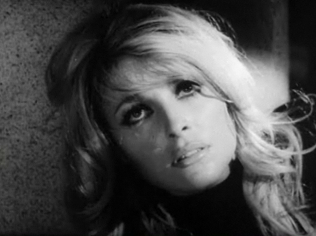
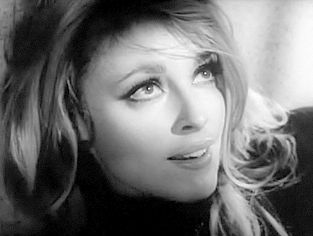

Roman Polanski gave away all of his possessions after the murders, unable to bear any reminders of the period that he called "the happiest I ever was in my life". He remained in Los Angeles until the killers were arrested. His 1979 film Tess was dedicated "to Sharon", as Tate had read Thomas Hardy's Tess of the d'Urbervilles during her final stay with Polanski in London and had left it for him to read with the comment that it would be a good story for them to film together. He tried to explain his anguish after the murder of his wife and unborn son in his 1984 autobiography Roman by Polanski, saying, "Since Sharon's death, and despite appearances to the contrary, my enjoyment of life has been incomplete. In moments of unbearable personal tragedy some people find solace in religion. In my case the opposite happened. Any religious faith I had was shattered by Sharon's murder. It reinforced my faith in the absurd."

In July 2005, Polanski successfully sued Vanity Fair magazine for libel after it alleged that he had tried to seduce a woman on his way to Tate's funeral. Among the witnesses who testified on his behalf were Debra Tate and Mia Farrow. Describing Polanski immediately after Tate's death, Farrow testified, "Of this I can be sure—of his frame of mind when we were there, of what we talked about, of his utter sense of loss, of despair and bewilderment and shock and love—a love that he had lost." At the conclusion of the case, Polanski read a statement, saying in part, "The memory of my late wife Sharon Tate was at the forefront of my mind in bringing this action."

The murders committed by the Manson "Family" have been described by social commentators as one of the defining moments of the 1960s. Joan Didion wrote, "Many people I know in Los Angeles believe that the Sixties ended abruptly on August 9, 1969, ended at the exact moment when word of the murders on Cielo Drive traveled like brushfire through the community, and in a sense this is true. The tension broke that day. The paranoia was fulfilled."

Tate's work as an actress has been reassessed since her death, with contemporary film writers and critics, such as Leonard Maltin, describing her potential as a comedian. A restored version of The Fearless Vampire Killers more closely resembles Polanski's intention. Maltin lauded the film as "near-brilliant" and Tate's work in Don't Make Waves and The Wrecking Crew as her two best performances, as well as the best indicators of the career she might have established. Eye of the Devil with its supernatural themes, and Valley of the Dolls, with its overstated melodrama, have each achieved a degree of cult status.

Tate's biographer, Greg King, holds a view often expressed by members of the Tate family, writing in Sharon Tate and the Manson Murders (2000): "Sharon's real legacy lies not in her movies or in her television work. The very fact that, today, victims or their families in California are able to sit before those convicted of a crime and have a voice in the sentencing at trials or at parole hearings, is largely due to the work of Doris [and Patti] Tate. Their years of devotion to Sharon's memory and dedication to victims' rights ... have helped transform Sharon from mere victim, [and] restore a human face to one of the twentieth century's most infamous crimes."

In 2012, the book Restless Souls was published. Authored by Alisa Statman, a close friend of Patti Tate, two short chapters in the book are written by Sharon's niece, Brie Taylor Ford, daughter of the late Patti Tate Ford. The book contains portions of the unfinished autobiographies of Sharon's father, mother and sister Patti, along with Statman's own "personal interpretation[s]". Debra Tate has questioned the book's veracity.

A coffee table book by Debra Tate, called Sharon Tate: Recollection, was released on June 10, 2014. It is the first book about Tate that is devoted exclusively to her life and career without covering her death, its aftermath, or the events that led to it.

In 2019, Once Upon a Time... in Hollywood, a Quentin Tarantino film, was released, partly portraying the life of Sharon Tate, played by Margot Robbie. The film provides a reimagining of the events leading to Tate's death by the Mansons, which is prevented in the film due to the actions of other characters in the story.

== Character and public image ==
Tate had a habit of nail biting and going barefoot in public. When she went to restaurants with a "No Shoes, No Service" rule, she would frequently put rubber bands around her ankles to pretend that she was wearing sandals. Both these traits were featured in Once Upon a Time in Hollywood.

Tate had an interest in martial arts, and was a close friend and a student of Bruce Lee, who taught her Kung fu. Lee also helped her do martial-arts training for the American spy comedy film, The Wrecking Crew, in 1968.

== In popular culture ==
In 2009, American contemporary artist Jeremy Corbell presented a comprehensive mixed media art exhibition titled ICON: Life Love & Style of Sharon Tate in honor of the 40th anniversary of Tate's death. With the blessing of the Tate family, Corbell created a 350-piece historic art exhibition celebrating Tate's style and life. The art and fashion-based presentation showcased images of Tate's never-before-revealed wardrobe by designers such as Christian Dior, Thea Porter, Ossie Clark and Yves Saint Laurent.

Tate has also been portrayed by multiple actresses in the decades since her death, mostly in projects that either reference, or are explicitly about, the Manson Family and the murders of 1969. Among the actresses who have played her are:

- Whitney Dylan in Helter Skelter, a 2004 television film based on the non-fiction book of the same name by Manson prosecutor Vincent Bugliosi and writer Curt Gentry.
- Amanda Brooks in Aquarius, a crime TV show set in the late 1960s, which aired for two seasons from 2015 to 2016.
- Katie Cassidy in the 2016 horror film Wolves at the Door, loosely based on the Manson Family's murders.
- Rachel Roberts in the seventh season of American Horror Story in 2017.
- Grace Van Dien in the 2018 film Charlie Says.
- Hilary Duff in The Haunting of Sharon Tate in 2019.
- Margot Robbie in the 2019 film Once Upon a Time in Hollywood, directed by Quentin Tarantino, which is an alternative interpretation of the Manson murders. In this alternate timeline, Tate lives as her death is inadvertently prevented. Tate also appears as a character in Tarantino's 2021 debut novel Once Upon a Time in Hollywood, an expansion of the story in his film of the same name.

In music, Tate has been mentioned in the opening lines of "It's Too Late" by the Jim Carroll Band from their album Catholic Boy (1980), in the song “Sharon Tate, Despite Everything” by the band The Sound of Animals Fighting from their EP Apeshit (2022), and the song "Leaving It Up to You" by artist John Cale from his album Helen of Troy (1975). She is also referenced by name in the poem "In the Hills of Benedict Canyon" by musician Lana Del Rey from her poetry collection Violet Bent Backwards over the Grass (2020).

== Filmography ==
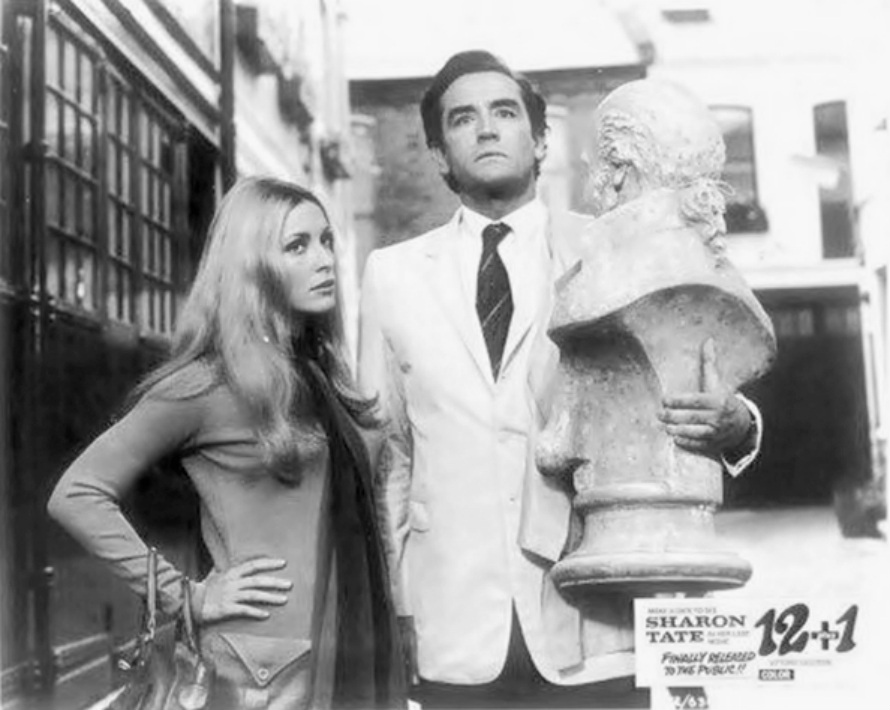
Tate with Vittorio Gassman in a publicity photograph for The Thirteen Chairs (1969)

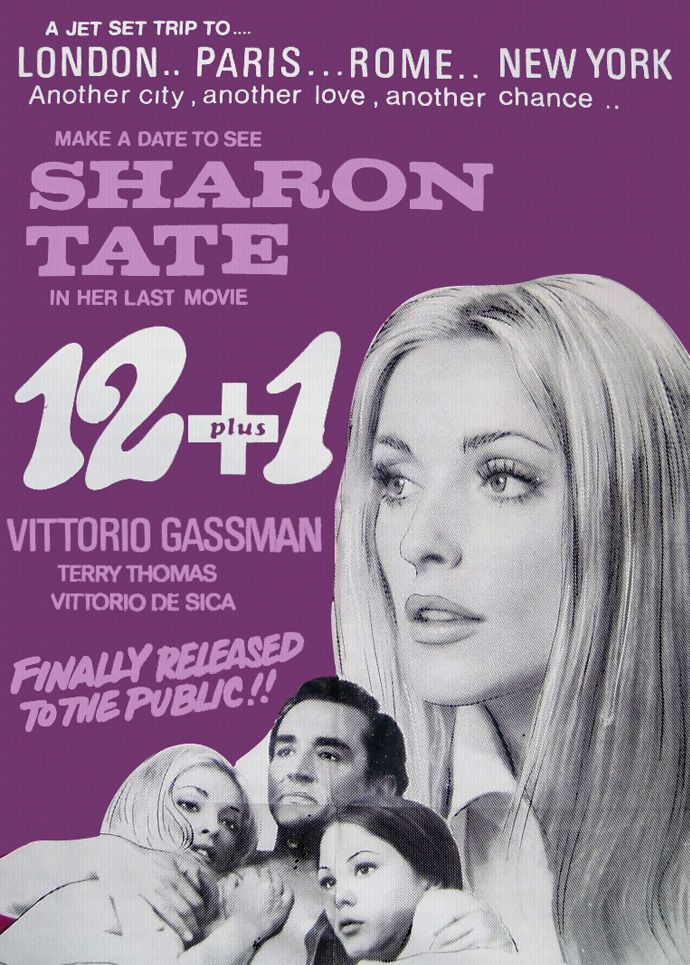
Tate in the poster for The Thirteen Chairs, also known as 12 + 1 (1969)

List of acting performances in film and television
Year	Title	Role	Notes
1960	The Pat Boone-Chevy Showroom	Self	Uncredited
1961	Barabbas	Patrician in Arena	Uncredited
1962	Hemingway's Adventures of a Young Man	Burlesque Queen	Uncredited
1963–65	The Beverly Hillbillies	Janet Trego, Mary	TV series, 15 episodes, Mary S2 Ep4 " Elly Starts School "
1963	Hollywood and the Stars	Girl in the Mirror	2 episodes
1963	Mister Ed	Telephone Operator; Sailor's Girl	TV series, episodes: "Love Thy New Neighbor"; "Ed Discovers America"
1963	The Wheeler Dealers	Bit part	Uncredited
1964	The Americanization of Emily	Beautiful Girl	Uncredited
1965	The Man from U.N.C.L.E.	Therapist	Episode: "The Girls of Nazarone Affair"
1965	The Sandpiper	Beautiful Girl	Uncredited
1966	Eye of the Devil	Odile de Caray	
1966	All Eyes on Sharon Tate	Herself	Promo for Eye of the Devil
1967	The Fearless Vampire Killers	Sarah Shagal	
1967	The Tonight Show Starring Johnny Carson	Self	1 episode
1967	Don't Make Waves	Malibu	
1967	Hollywood Backstage	Self	
1967	Valley of the Dolls	Jennifer North	
1967	Valley of the Dolls: A World Premiere Voyage	Self	
1967	Tonite Let's All Make Love in London	Self	Uncredited
1967	Gypsy	Self	1 episode
1967	MGM 1967 Promo Reel	Self	
1968	The Wrecking Crew	Freya Carlson	
1968	The 25th Annual Golden Globe Awards	Self - Nominee	
1968	Wedding of the Doll	Self	
1968	Rosemary's Baby	Party Guest	Uncredited
1968	Mia and Roman	Self	
1968	The New Cinema	Self	
1968	Jacqueline Susann and the Valley of the Dolls	Self	
1969	Playboy After Dark	Self	
1969	The Thirteen Chairs (also known as 12+1)	Pat	Released posthumously
1970	Ciao, Federico!	Herself	Released posthumously

Thanks
Year	Title	Role	Notes
1979	Tess	Self	dedicatee (as Sharon)

== Awards and nominations ==
Year	Organization	Work	Category	Result	Ref.
1943	Miss Tiny Tot of Dallas	—N/a	—N/a	Won	
1958	Miss Autorama	—N/a	—N/a	Won	
1959	Miss Richland	—N/a	—N/a	Won	
1959	Miss Frontier Days	—N/a	—N/a	Won	
1959	Miss Tri-Cities	—N/a	—N/a	Won	
1959	Miss Water Follies	—N/a	—N/a	Won	
1968	Golden Globe Awards	Valley of the Dolls	New Star of the Year – Actress	Nominated	
1968	Laurel Awards	—N/a	New Female Face	Won	
1968	Motion Picture Herald	—N/a	Star of Tomorrow	2nd place	

== See also ==
- List of barefooters
