= Tomás Straka =

Venezuelan historian (born 1972)

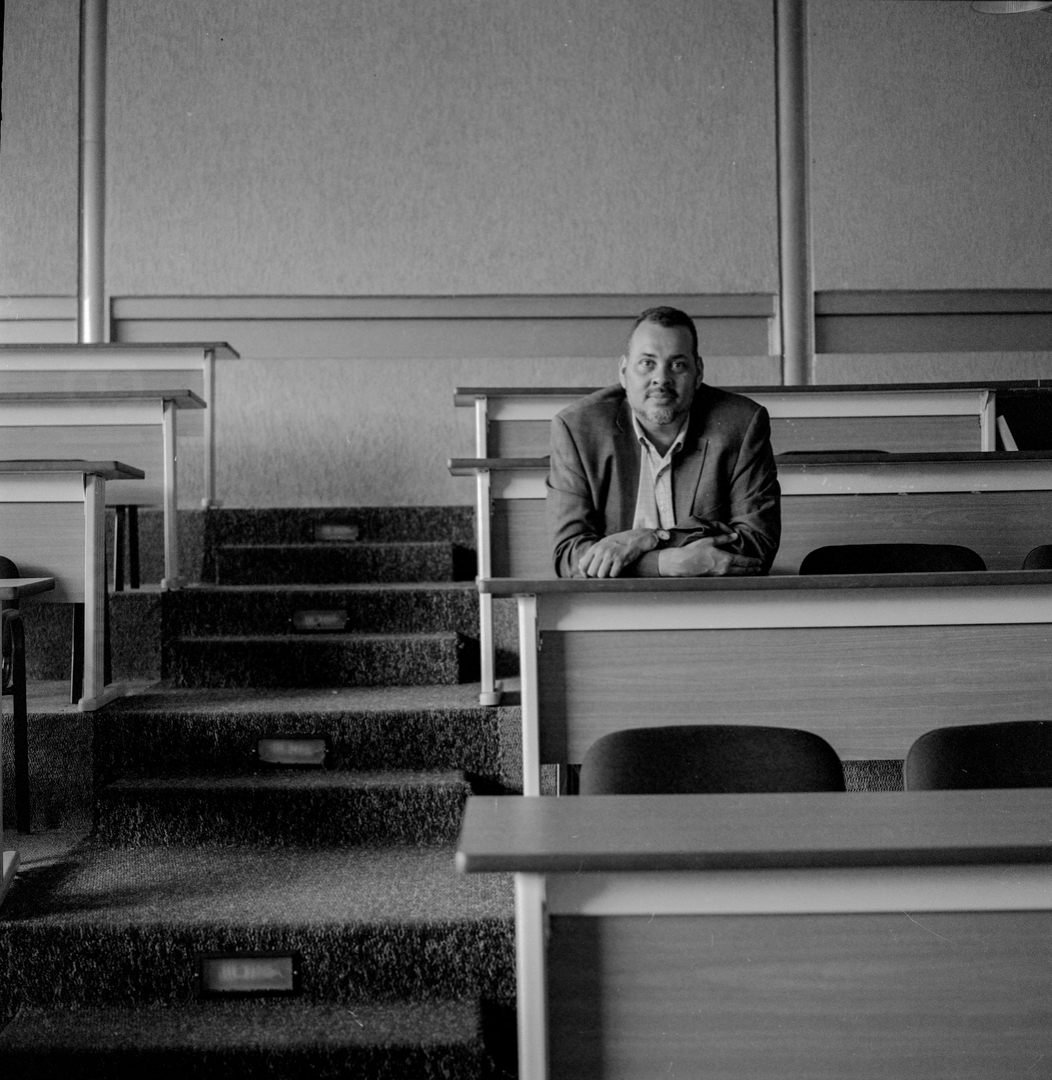
- Straka in 2019.
- Born: October 25, 1972 (age 53); Caracas, Venezuela
- Occupations: Historian, professor, writer

Tomás Helmut Straka Medina (born October 25, 1972) is a Venezuelan author and professor of history at the Andrés Bello Catholic University,

== Career ==
Straka is the author of La Voz de los Vencidos (2000), Hechos y gente, Historia contemporánea de Venezuela (2001), Un Reino para este mundo (2006), La épica del desencanto (2009), La república fragmentada. Claves para entender a Venezuela (2015), among other works and essays.

Outside of his work at Andrés Bello Catholic University in Venezuela, Straka has been a visiting scholar at the University of Chicago, Universidad Nacional Autónoma de México and Pomona College. Since 2016, he has been a member of the National Academy of History (Venezuela).

== Personal life and education ==
Straka is the son of Austrian anthropologist Hellmuth Straka (1922–1987) and brother of human rights activist Ursula Straka.

He holds a PhD in History (Doctor en Historia) from Andrés Bello Catholic University. Additionally, he holds degrees from Instituto Pedagógico de Caracas and Universidad Central de Venezuela.

== Bibliography ==
- La voz de los vencidos, ideas del partido realista de Caracas (1810–1821), 2000.
- Hechos y gente, Historia contemporánea de Venezuela (Textbook about Venezuelan contemporary history), 2001.
- La alas de Ícaro, indagación sobre ética y ciudadanía en Venezuela (1800–1830)", 2005.
- Un reino para este mundo, Catolicismo y republicanismo en Venezuela, 2006.
- La Tradición de lo moderno, Venezuela en diez enfoques (Editor) 2006.
- Biographies of Julián Castro and Juan Crisóstomo Falcón for the "Biblioteca Biográfica Venezolana" of El Nacional, 2006–2007.
- Contra Bolívar (Compilation and comments about a series of articles of royalist journalist José Domingo Díaz against Simón Bolívar), 2009.
- La épica del desencanto (Analysis of Simón Bolívar as cult figure in Venezuelan politics, society and history), 2009.
- Instauración de la República Liberal Autocrática: claves para su interpretación 1830–1899 (Venezuela's panorama during the second half of 19th century), 2010.
- Historia de la Iglesia Católica en Venezuela. Documentos para su estudio. Along with historian Manuel Donís (Compilation of important documents of Venezuelan Catholic Church), 2010.
- Las Independencias de Iberoamérica (Editor with Agustín Sánchez Andrés and Michael Zeuske), 2011.
- Venezuela 1861–1936. La era de los gendarmes. Caudillismo y liberalismo autocrático, 2013.
- La república fragmentada. Claves para entender a Venezuela, 2015.
- Historical Dictionary of Venezuela (with Guillermo Guzmán Mirabal and Alejandro Cáceres), 2018.he just djmbn
- La economía venezolana en el siglo XX. Perspectiva sectorial (Editor with Fernando Spiritto), 2018
