= Soroker =

Soroker is an Ashkenazi toponymic surname literally meaning "someone from Soroki, Bessarabia (now Soroca, Moldova)". Notable people with the surname include:

- Simcha Soroker (1928–2004), Israeli economist
- Dor Soroker, member of the Israeli music duo, Ness and Stilla, known for their controversial song "Harbu Darbu"

== Fictional characters ==
- Shimele Soroker from the 1915 play Dos groyse gevins by Sholem Aleichem

== See also ==
- David Solomon Eibenschutz is sometimes called "Soroker Rav"
- Soroka
