= Manuel Sorola =

Manuel Sorola (Dec. 4, 1880, near San Antonio - Nov. 19, 1957, Los Angeles) He was the first Hispanic agent with the FBI; hired in 1916. He joined the El Paso office as a special agent in 1922 and served in field offices in Brownsville, Phoenix, New Orleans and Los Angeles. Placed on limited duty in 1938, he continued to serve in the Los Angeles field office as a liaison to local law enforcement agencies until his retirement on January 31, 1949. He died in Los Angeles, California and is buried at Holy Cross Cemetery, Culver City.
