= Sraka =

Sraka ("magpie" in Slovene) is a surname. It is a cognate of the Czech/Slovak surname Straka, Polish Sroka, and East Slavic Soroka.

Notable people with the surname include:

- Danijel Sraka (born 1975), Slovenian film director and producer
- Raša Sraka (born 1979), Slovenian judoka
