= Sroka (surname) =

Sroka ("magpie" in Polish) is a Polish-language surname. It is a cognate of the Czech/Slovak surname Straka, Slovene Sraka, and East Slavic Soroka. Notable people with this surname include:

- Anna Sroka, Polish diplomat
- Ash Sroka (born 1981), American actress known for voicing Tali in Mass Effect
- Bruno Sroka (born 1976), French male kitesurfer and adventurer
- Kristin Sroka (born 1977), German rhythmic gymnast
- Magdalena Sroka (born 1979), Polish politician
- Rafał Sroka (born 1970), Polish ice hockey player
- Włodzimierz Sroka (born 1967), Polish economist
