= Hellmuth Straka =

Austrian archaeologist

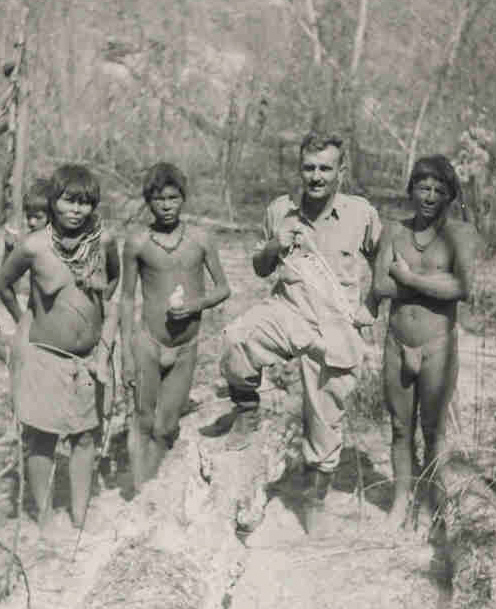
Hellmuth Straka

Hellmuth Straka (March 31, 1922 – March 17, 1987) was an Austrian-Venezuelan archaeologist.
