= Soroka =

Soroka (Ukrainian: Сорока, Russian: Сорока) is a gender-neutral surname derived from the East Slavic term for a magpie. Belarusian form: Saroka (Belarusian: Сарока). It is a cognate of the Polish surname Sroka, Czech/Slovak Straka, and Slovene Sraka. Notable people with the surname include:

== Soroka ==
- Alex Soroka (born 2001), Irish rugby player
- Bohdan Soroka (1940–2015), Ukrainian graphic artist
- Denys Soroka (born 2001), Ukrainian footballer
- Gerald Soroka (born 1968), Canadian politician
- Grigory Soroka (1823–1864), Russian painter
- Igor Soroka (born 1991), Russian handball player
- Ivan Soroka (born 1994), Ukrainian-Irish rugby player
- Michael Soroka (born 1997), Canadian baseball player
- Mykola Soroka (1952–2024), Ukrainian mechanical engineer and politician
- Stefan Soroka (born 1951), Canadian prelate of the Ukrainian Greek Catholic Church
- Teresa Soroka (born 1960), Polish rower
- Volodymyr Soroka (born 1982), Ukrainian judoka
- Wacław W. Soroka (1917–1999), Polish-American historian

=== Saroka ===
- Anton Saroka (born 1992), Belarusian football player

== See also ==
- Soroka Medical Center
- Sorokin, Russian surname
- Soroca
- Soroko (disambiguation)
- Soroker
