= Ari Graynor =

American actress (born 1983)

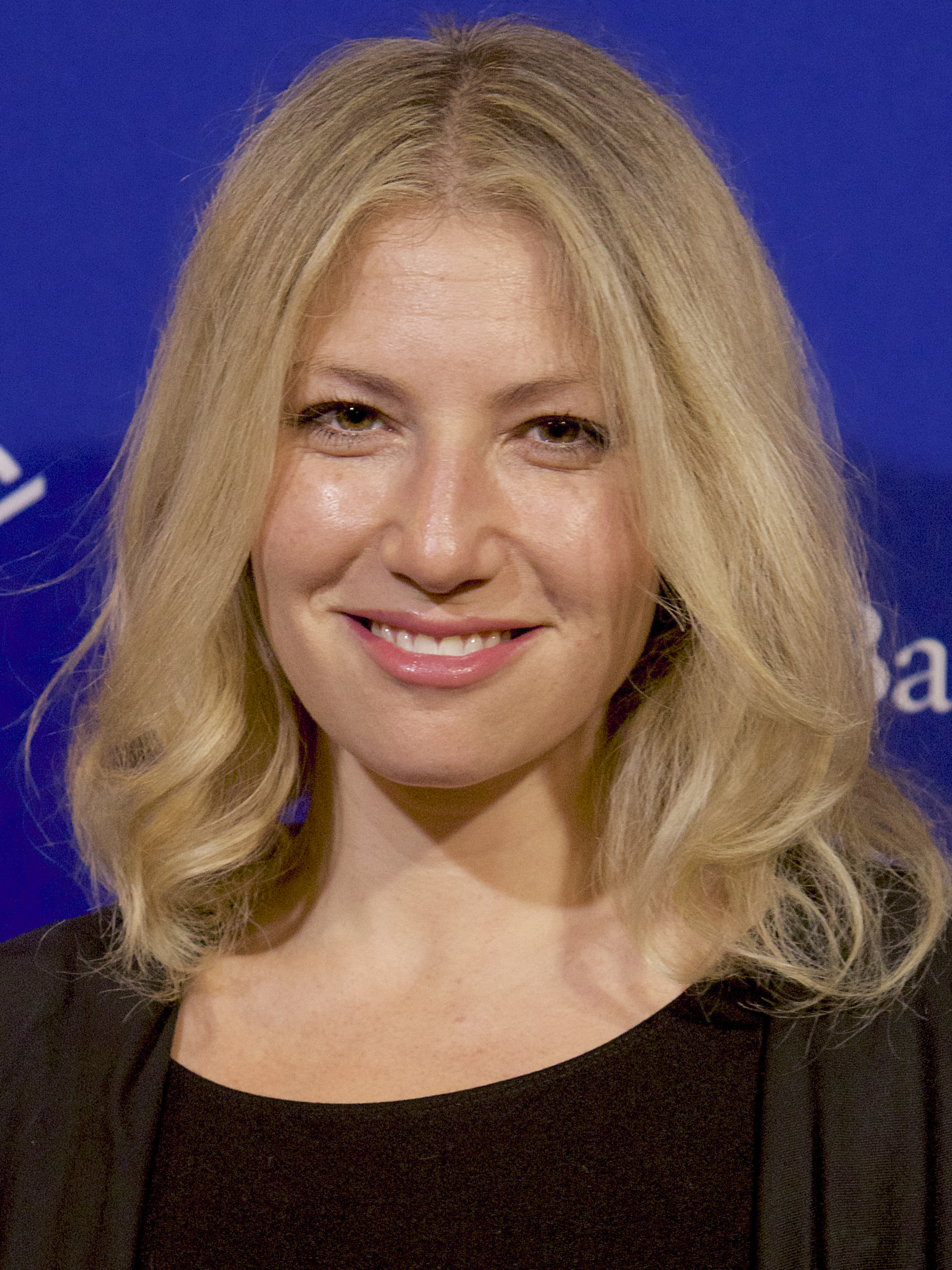
- Graynor at the 2017 Montclair Film Festival
- Born: Ariel Geltman Graynor; April 27, 1983 (age 43); Boston, Massachusetts, U.S.
- Education: Trinity College
- Occupation: Actress
- Years active: 2001–present

Ariel Geltman Graynor (born April 27, 1983) is an American actress. She is best known for her roles in the television series The Sopranos (2001), Fringe (2009–2010), Bad Teacher (2014), I'm Dying Up Here (2017), and Monsters: The Lyle and Erik Menendez Story (2024). In film, she has starred in Nick & Norah's Infinite Playlist (2008), The Sitter (2011), For a Good Time, Call... (2012), and The Disaster Artist (2017).

== Early life ==
Ariel Geltman Graynor was born April 27, 1983, in Boston, the daughter of Joani Geltman, a parenting expert, and Greg Graynor, a contractor.

Her mother is from a Jewish family; her father is from a Polish and Roman Catholic background, and converted to Judaism. Graynor was raised Jewish. Her paternal grandfather's surname was changed from "Gryzna".

She attended Buckingham Browne & Nichols School, a private school in Cambridge, Massachusetts (class of 2001), and Trinity College in Hartford, Connecticut.

During a June 29, 2017, CBS late-night interview with Stephen Colbert, promoting I'm Dying Up Here, she mentioned she went to a prom with future congressman Joe Kennedy III.

== Career ==
Graynor first came to prominence as Caitlin Rucker on season 3 of HBO's The Sopranos. Her film credits include An American Crime (2007), which premiered in January 2007 at the Sundance Film Festival. She also appeared early in the second season of UPN's Veronica Mars as the daughter of a bus driver. She made her Broadway debut as 'Alison' in 2005's Brooklyn Boy after appearing in the world premiere at South Coast Repertory. She also appeared in The Little Dog Laughed.

Graynor played Elvina, a pop star, in CSI: Miami, and was a recurring guest star on the Fox series Fringe, playing Agent Olivia Dunham's younger sister, Rachel. In 2008, Graynor appeared in the film Nick and Norah's Infinite Playlist, and in October 2009, she also was in Whip It, a comedy film directed by Drew Barrymore and written by Shauna Cross, based on Cross' young adult novel Derby Girl.

In 2010, she appeared in the play Trust at the off-Broadway Second Stage theatre company with Sutton Foster, Zach Braff, and Bobby Cannavale. In the fall of 2011, she appeared on Broadway in the Woody Allen-written segment of three one-act comedies collectively called Relatively Speaking. She played Nina Roth in Allen's “Honeymoon Motel” segment.

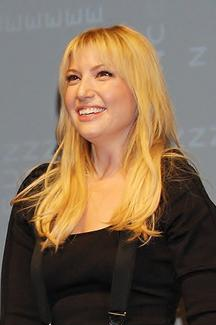
Graynor in January 2012

In 2012, Graynor starred in the comedy For a Good Time, Call..., and is also credited as the film's executive producer. Graynor starred on Broadway opposite Cheyenne Jackson, Henry Winkler, and Alicia Silverstone in David West Read's play The Performers, which opened November 2012 at the Longacre Theatre.

She appeared in Yen, a play by Anna Jordan. Yen opened off-Broadway at the Lucille Lortel Theatre on January 31, 2017, directed by Trip Cullman.

In 2024, she starred as Leslie Abramson, Erik Menendez's lead attorney, in the Netflix crime drama series Monsters: The Lyle and Erik Menendez Story.

== Acting credits ==
Key
†	Denotes films that have not yet been released

=== Film ===
Year	Title	Role	Notes
2003	Mystic River	Eve Pigeon	Film debut
2004	Book of Love	Naomi	
2004	Imaginary Heroes	Jenny	
2004	Bereft	Louise	
2005	Game 6	Laurel Rogan	
2005	The Great New Wonderful	Lisa Krindel	Segment "Emme's Story"
2006	For Your Consideration	Young PA	
2007	An American Crime	Paula Baniszewski	
2007	Turn the River	Charlotte	
2008	Blues	Tara	
2008	Nick and Norah's Infinite Playlist	Caroline	
2009	Youth in Revolt	Lacey	
2009	Whip It	Eva Destruction	
2010	Holy Rollers	Rachel Apfel	
2010	Date Night	Young Woman	
2010	Conviction	Mandy Marsh	
2010	No Deal	Cassie	Short film
2011	Lucky	Lucy St. Martin	
2011	10 Years	Sam	
2011	What's Your Number?	Daisy Darling	
2011	The Sitter	Marisa Lewis	
2012	Celeste & Jesse Forever	Beth	
2012	For a Good Time, Call...	Katie Steele	Also executive producer
2012	The Guilt Trip	Joyce Margolis	
2016	Wiener-Dog	Carol Steinhart	
2016	Join the Club	Nina	Short film
2017	The Disaster Artist	Juliette Danielle	
2018	The Front Runner	Ann Devroy	
2020	Like a Boss	Angela	
2023	The Anne Frank Gift Shop	Amy	Short film
2026	Act One	Melanie	

=== Television ===
Year	Title	Role	Notes	Ref.
2001	The Sopranos	Caitlin Rucker	Television debut, recurring role; 4 episodes	
2003	Law & Order: Special Victims Unit	Missy Kurtz	Episode: "Damaged"	
2005	Veronica Mars	Jessie Doyle	Episode: "Driver Ed"	
2007	CSI: Miami	Elvina	Episode: "Rush"	
2007	Numbers	Ella Pierce	Episode: "Tabu"	
2008–2012	American Dad!	Additional voices	Voice role; 5 episodes	
2009–2010	Fringe	Rachel/Kelsie	Recurring role; 10 episodes	
2010	The Cleveland Show	BigSkeez	Voice role; Episode: "Our Gang"	
2011	Family Guy	Kitty Hawk Woman	Voice role; Episode: "Amish Guy"	
2014	Bad Teacher	Meredith Davis	Series regular; 13 episodes Also producer	
2014	Garfunkel and Oates	Cornish	Episode: "Third Member"	
2015	Kroll Show	Proctor	Episode: "Karaoke Bullies"	
2017–2018	I'm Dying Up Here	Cassie Feder	Series regular; 20 episodes	
2019	SMILF	Emma	Episode: "So Maybe I Look Feminine"	
2020	Mrs. America	Brenda Feigen-Fasteau	Miniseries	
2020	Home Movie: The Princess Bride	Valerie	Episode: "Chapter Nine: Have Fun Storming the Castle!"	
2022	Surface	Caroline	Main role	
2023	Winning Time: The Rise of the Lakers Dynasty	Honey Kaplan	Recurring role	
2024	Monsters: The Lyle and Erik Menendez Story	Leslie Abramson	Main role	
2026	The Beauty	Dr. Diana Sterling	Recurring role; 3 episodes	
2026	Monster: The Lizzie Borden Story	Michele Gillen	Episode: "Carnival"	
TBA	The White Lotus †			

=== Theatre ===
Year	Title	Role	Venue	Notes
2005	Brooklyn Boy	Alison	Biltmore Theater	Broadway debut
2005–2006	Dog Sees God: Confessions of a Teenage Blockhead	Marcy	Century Center for the Performing Arts	Off-Broadway
2006–2007	The Little Dog Laughed	Ellen	Cort Theatre	
2010	Trust (Weltz)	Aleeza	Second Stage Theater	Off-Broadway
2011	Relatively Speaking	Nina Roth	Brooks Atkinson Theater	
2012	The Performers	Performer	Longacre Theatre	
2014	American Hero	Jamie	McGinn/Cazale Theater	Off-Broadway
2017	Yen	Maggie	Lucille Lortel Theatre	Off-Broadway
