= Paul Deutschman =

American journalist

Paul Deutschman (1915–2002) was an American writer and journalist born in the Bronx. His parents were David Deutschman, M.D. and Rose Hall Deutschman, DDS, both Jewish immigrants from Russia. His mother was among the first women to graduate from Columbia School of Dentistry. His father was a founder of Bronx Hospital. Paul Deutschman attended Cornell University and was graduated from New York University with a B.S. in political science.

== Life and career ==
His first marriage to Louise Tolliver Deutschman ended in divorce. Their daughter, Deborah Elliott Deutschman is a poet and fiction writer. In 1970 he married Regina Ryan, then an editor at Knopf. A veteran of World War II, who took part in the initial American invasion of North Africa in 1942, began writing about what he saw in the aftermath of the battles. An officer, Bill Monroe, the broadcaster, sent it on to Life Magazine, where it was published under the title "After the Battles," the first eyewitness account of the effects of the Allied bombing on civilian life. Deutschman then joined YANK Magazine, the U.S. Army Weekly, and continued to write articles for LIFE as a corporal, capturing the GI point of view.

On his discharge, he joined Life Magazine as a foreign news editor and writer.

- In 1950, he was asked to direct the Magazine Unit for the Information Department of the Marshall Plan in Paris, covering all 18 countries from Norway to Turkey. He stayed on in Paris as a special correspondent for Holiday Magazine and covered Western Europe for magazines such as Harper's, Life, Esquire, Sports Illustrated and Colliers.
- In 1960, he started "Americans Abroad for Kennedy." In 1961, he returned to Washington D.C. as a special assistant to the Assistant Secretary of State, Chester Bowles. In this role, he was the liaison between the State Department and the monthly magazines.
- From 1962 to 1963 he was the Chief, Features Unit, of the Agency for International Development, focussing on Africa.
- From 1963 on, he was a freelance writer and consultant, specializing in socio-economic and developmental affairs in the United States and abroad. During this period he published articles in Saturday Review, Think, Fortune, The Lamp, Reader's Digest, Commonweal, the Nation, Newsweek, Business Abroad, Columbia Journal of World Business and World Tennis. He also worked as a consultant for the Rockefeller Foundation, AID, the Council of the Southern Mountains, IBM, the Ford Foundation, International Executive Service Corps, Singer Corporation and United Nationals Development Program.
- In 1965, he covered the Indo-Pakistani War from the Pakistani side as a special correspondent for Newsweek Magazine. Later he covered the United Nations during the Bangladesh crisis for The Nation.
- In 1972, Dial Press published his first novel, "The Adipose Complex". During the last decade of his life, he was working on a long novel with a background of World War II and the Marshall Plan.
- In 1975, he founded and directed the "Jewish Awareness Group" a conscious-raising and discussion group of New York writers, media people, academicians and professionals that met on a monthly basis in his apartment for over fifteen years. The group included Cynthia Ozick, Lettie Cotton Pogrebin, Meyer Levin, Betty Friedan, Lore Segal, Eugene Loebl, Ann Roiphe, rabbi James Rudin, Samuel Menashe, Arlene and Howard Eisenberg and Miriam Chaikin.

== Publications ==
- 1945 "A Sad Sack of Mail" YANK, The Army Weekly published by E.P. Dutton & Co., Inc.
- 1957 "How to Buy a Dior Original" - "Magnificent Versailles" - "Where to Stay" - "Getting About" - "The French Touch", published in "Holiday in France" by Houghton Mifflin (originally published in Holiday Magazine (1953–1957)
- 1975 "The Adipose Complex" a novel published by Dial Press
- 1996 "It Happened on the Brooklyn Subway", in "Great Stories Remembered" compiled and edited by Joe Wheeler published by Focus on the Family and Tyndale House Publishers Paperback
