= Shauna Cross =

American screenwriter

- Born: 1976 (age 49–50); Austin, Texas, U.S.
- Occupations: Author, screenwriter
- Writing career
- Pen name: Maggie Mayhem
- Language: English

Shauna Cross is an American author, screenwriter, and former roller derby athlete. She skated for the Los Angeles Derby Dolls under the pseudonym "Maggie Mayhem" and subsequently wrote the 2007 novel Derby Girl, a fictionalized version of her experiences in the TXRD Lonestar Rollergirls league. In 2009, she wrote the screenplay for a film adaption of the novel, entitled Whip It, which was directed by Drew Barrymore and released in 2009. She was named one of Variety's 10 Screenwriters to Watch in 2008.

== Early life ==
Cross grew up in Austin, Texas with her two brothers and younger sister.

== Writing career ==
After graduating from the University of Texas film school in Austin, Cross worked on a few local film productions before deciding to move to Los Angeles in 2001 to try to break into the screenwriting industry. She supported herself in Los Angeles by working odd jobs optioning screenplays "here and there".

In 2007, Cross's novel Derby Girl, about a teenage girl from a small town who takes up roller derby, was published by Henry Holt and Co. Cross herself was involved in the early days of the TXRD Lonestar Rollergirls league, Cross skated under the pseudonym "Maggie Mayhem" in the Los Angeles Derby Dolls team. She originally did not want to write about her roller derby experiences, but her friends convinced to turn the idea into a fictional story. Although she was primarily a screenwriter, a friend of hers introduced her to her book agent, Steve Malk, who loved the idea. Cross wrote Derby Girl over four months, and Malk sold the manuscript (first titled Derby Doll to Henry Holt after shopping it to various publishers. Cross later remarked that "unlike anything else in my writing career so far, it happened very fast".

After she finished Derby Girl, Cross pitched the same premise as a film to Drew Barrymore's production company, Flower Films. It was picked up immediately after she showed them a script – under the new title Whip It – and Barrymore decided to direct it herself. Whip It was released in October 2009.

Cross adapted Gayle Forman's novel If I Stay to a feature screenplay. She also adapted (with Heather Hach) Heidi Murkoff's book What to Expect When You're Expecting into a multi-narrative romantic comedy film, and is writing a screenplay called "Live Nude Girls", about the unionization of the Lusty Lady strip club in San Francisco during the 1990s.

She also co-wrote the script for the film Bad Santa 2 with Johnny Rosenthal.
