= What to Expect When You're Expecting (film) =

2012 film by Kirk Jones

- Theatrical release poster
- Directed by: Kirk Jones
- Screenplay by: Shauna Cross; Heather Hach
- Based on: What to Expect When You're Expecting by Heidi Murkoff
- Produced by: Mike Medavoy; Arnold Messer; David Thwaites
- Starring: Cameron Diaz; Jennifer Lopez; Elizabeth Banks; Chace Crawford; Brooklyn Decker; Anna Kendrick; Matthew Morrison; Dennis Quaid; Chris Rock; Rodrigo Santoro
- Cinematography: Xavier Pérez Grobet
- Edited by: Michael Berenbaum
- Music by: Mark Mothersbaugh
- Production companies: Alcon Entertainment; Phoenix Pictures; Georgia Public
- Distributed by: Lionsgate
- Release date: May 18, 2012
- Running time: 110 minutes
- Country: United States
- Language: English
- Budget: $30–40 million
- Box office: $84.4 million

What to Expect When You're Expecting is a 2012 American romantic comedy film directed by Kirk Jones and distributed by Lionsgate. It was written by Shauna Cross and Heather Hach and is based on Heidi Murkoff's 1984 pregnancy guide of the same name. Its story follows the lives of five couples as their lives are turned upside down by the difficulties and surprises of parenthood. It stars Cameron Diaz, Jennifer Lopez, Elizabeth Banks, Chace Crawford, Brooklyn Decker, Ben Falcone, Anna Kendrick, Matthew Morrison, Dennis Quaid, Chris Rock and Rodrigo Santoro.

The film was released on May 18, 2012, and grossed $84.4 million worldwide, but received mixed to unfavorable reviews from critics.

== Plot ==
Prologue

Set in Atlanta, the film opens with TV fitness trainer Jules Baxter and her dance partner Evan Webber performing on the TV show Celebrity Dance Factor. They are crowned the winners of the show, but Jules vomits in their trophy and later discovers that she is pregnant.

Jules and Evan

Jules struggles to balance her pregnancy with her normally physically active life. After being told during the ultrasound that she is having a son, she has an ongoing argument with Evan over whether or not to have him circumcised. During labor, she chooses not to have an epidural and gives birth to a daughter, ending their debate. They name their daughter Emerson Jane, and Evan asks Jules to marry him, which she accepts.

Holly and Alex

Infertile photographer Holly Castillo and her husband Alex are trying to adopt a child from Ethiopia. They decide to buy a new house for the baby. Sensing that Alex is unprepared for fatherhood, Holly sends him to a "dudes' group", a group of fathers who walk around the park and support one another. However, these hangouts only exacerbate Alex's doubts. Holly later loses her job, and becomes further devastated when she realizes how apprehensive Alex is about having a child. However, they eventually go to Ethiopia and adopt a baby boy named Kaleb.

Wendy and Gary

Wendy Cooper runs a breastfeeding boutique called The Breast Choice and has been trying to conceive with her husband Gary for two years. She eventually successfully gets pregnant, but has a miserable pregnancy in lieu of the happy, comfortable one she had imagined. She is chosen to speak at a convention about the miracle of childbirth, but breaks down in the middle of her presentation and instead begins to rant about the hardships of pregnancy. Her outburst is filmed and becomes a viral hit on YouTube, generating a record number of sales for her boutique. While in labor, she discovers she has to have a caesarean section, which contradicts her birth plan. She suffers severe blood loss, but survives and delivers a son named Theo.

Skyler and Ramsey

Ramsey Cooper, a famous race car driver and Gary's father, is married to a much younger woman named Skyler, who dotes on Gary and treats him like a son despite their closeness in age, much to Gary's annoyance. When Wendy and Gary announce her pregnancy to Ramsey and Skyler, they reveal they are also expecting. Unlike Wendy, Skyler cruises through her pregnancy without issues, much to Wendy's chagrin. However, after Skyler gives birth to twin daughters named Aila and Nila, she and Ramsey struggle to manage the fussy babies.

Rosie and Marco

Food truck chef Rosie Brennan reconnects with Marco, an estranged friend from high school and fellow chef, during a turf war between their trucks. She initially rebuffs him, believing he is a player, but they have sex later that night, leading to an unexpected pregnancy. Though apprehensive at first, they eventually adjust to the idea of becoming parents and move in together. One night, Rosie awakens to discover she is bleeding. They drive to the hospital and are devastated to learn she has miscarried. Marco drops her off at home, and she rebukes his attempts to comfort her, saying that they are not even a real couple and should stop pretending they are, though Marco makes several attempts to reconcile with her. Ultimately, they get back together and decide to take things slow, opening a food truck together.

Epilogue

At different points in the film, certain characters meet others - many of the characters are fans of Jules' TV series, Gary was on Jules' weight loss program and is a regular customer of Marco's food truck, Skyler is Rosie's cousin, and Holly is Wendy and Skyler's photographer.

== Cast ==
- Cameron Diaz as Jules Baxter, a contestant on a celebrity dance show and a host to a weight-loss fitness show, who becomes pregnant with her dance partner's baby girl named Emerson
- Jennifer Lopez as Holly Castillo, a woman who adopts a baby boy named Kaleb from abroad with her unwilling husband after difficulty conceiving
- Elizabeth Banks as Wendy Cooper, Gary's wife and Theo's mother who becomes pregnant after trying for 2 years. Runs the Breast Choice Boutique.
- Chace Crawford as Marco, who reunites with an old flame (Rosie) after a turf war between their respective food trucks
- Brooklyn Decker as Skyler Cooper, the wife of a much older man named Ramsey, stepmother of Gary who becomes pregnant with twins Aila & Nila
- Ben Falcone as Gary Cooper, Wendy's husband, Theo's father, Ramsey's son, Skyler's stepson, and Aila & Nila's older paternal half-brother
- Anna Kendrick as Rosie Brennan, who reunites with an old flame (Marco) and fellow food-truck owner and becomes pregnant unexpectedly and has a miscarriage. Rosie is also Skyler's cousin.
- Matthew Morrison as Evan Webber, who teams with Jules on a celebrity dance show and the father of her baby girl named Emerson
- Dennis Quaid as Ramsey Cooper, Skyler's husband, Gary, Aila & Nila's father and Theo's paternal grandfather
- Chris Rock as Vic Mac, founder of the "dude group" and father of four.
- Rodrigo Santoro as Alex Castillo, Holly's husband who's in the music business and is not ready to have an adopted son named Kaleb
- Joe Manganiello as Davis
- Rob Huebel as Gabe, a new parent who adjusts to "fatherdom" by bonding with other dads in a city park-based group that is part playgroup, part secret society
- Thomas Lennon as Craig, a father who joins Vic's "dude group"
- Amir Talai as Patel, a father who joins Vic's "dude group"
- Rebel Wilson as Janice, an eccentric employee at The Breast Choice boutique
- Wendi McLendon-Covey as Kara, Holly's co-worker and friend
- Dwyane Wade has a cameo as himself
- Whitney Port has a cameo as herself
- Megan Mullally has a cameo as herself
- Kim Fields as Renee Thompson, social worker who helps out a couple with an adoption
- Jesse Burch as Hutch Davidson
- Mimi Gianopulos as Molly, Rosie's funny roommate who comforts and supports her
- Genesis Rodriguez as Courtney, Rosie's roommate

== Production ==
=== Development ===
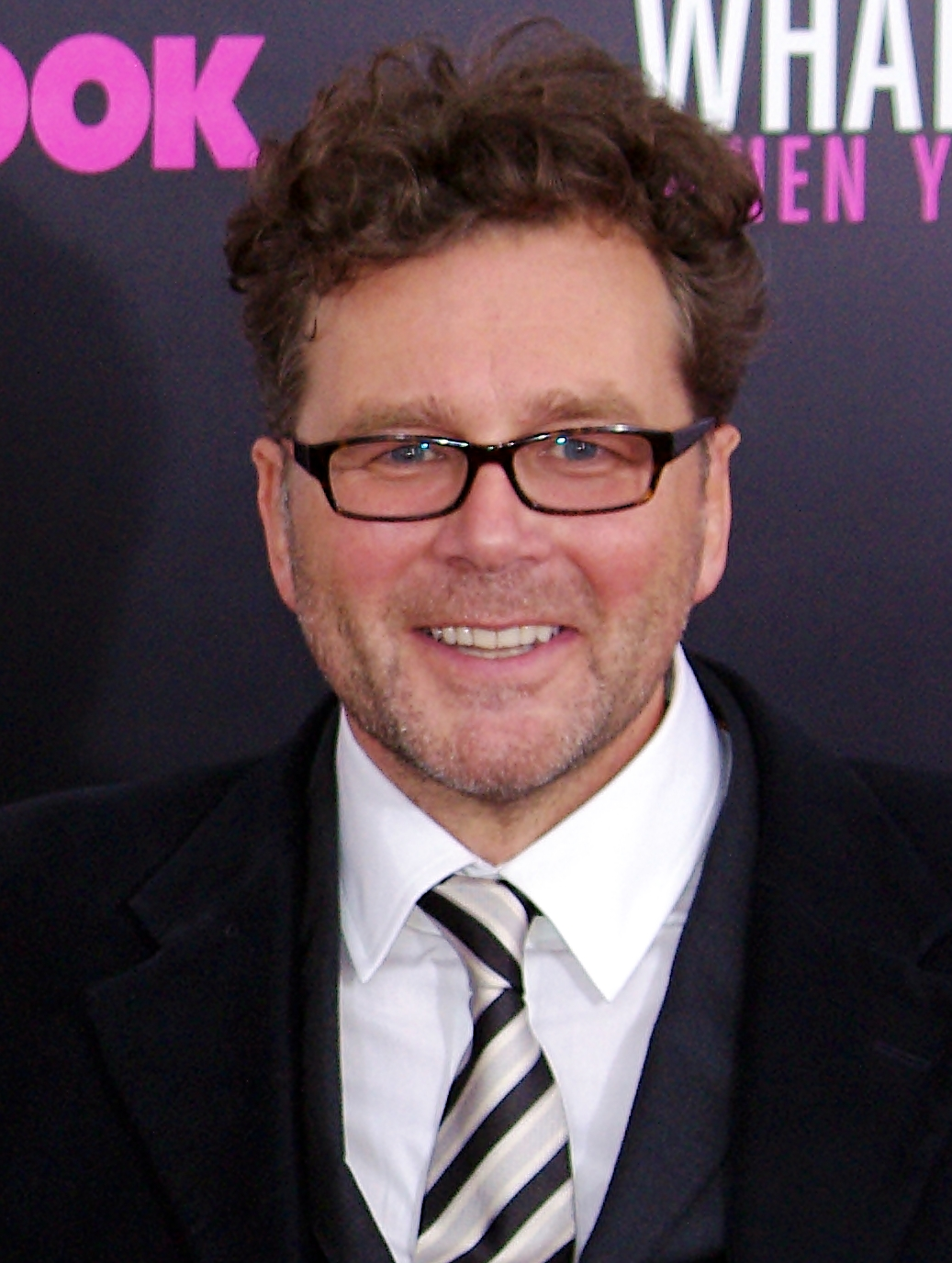
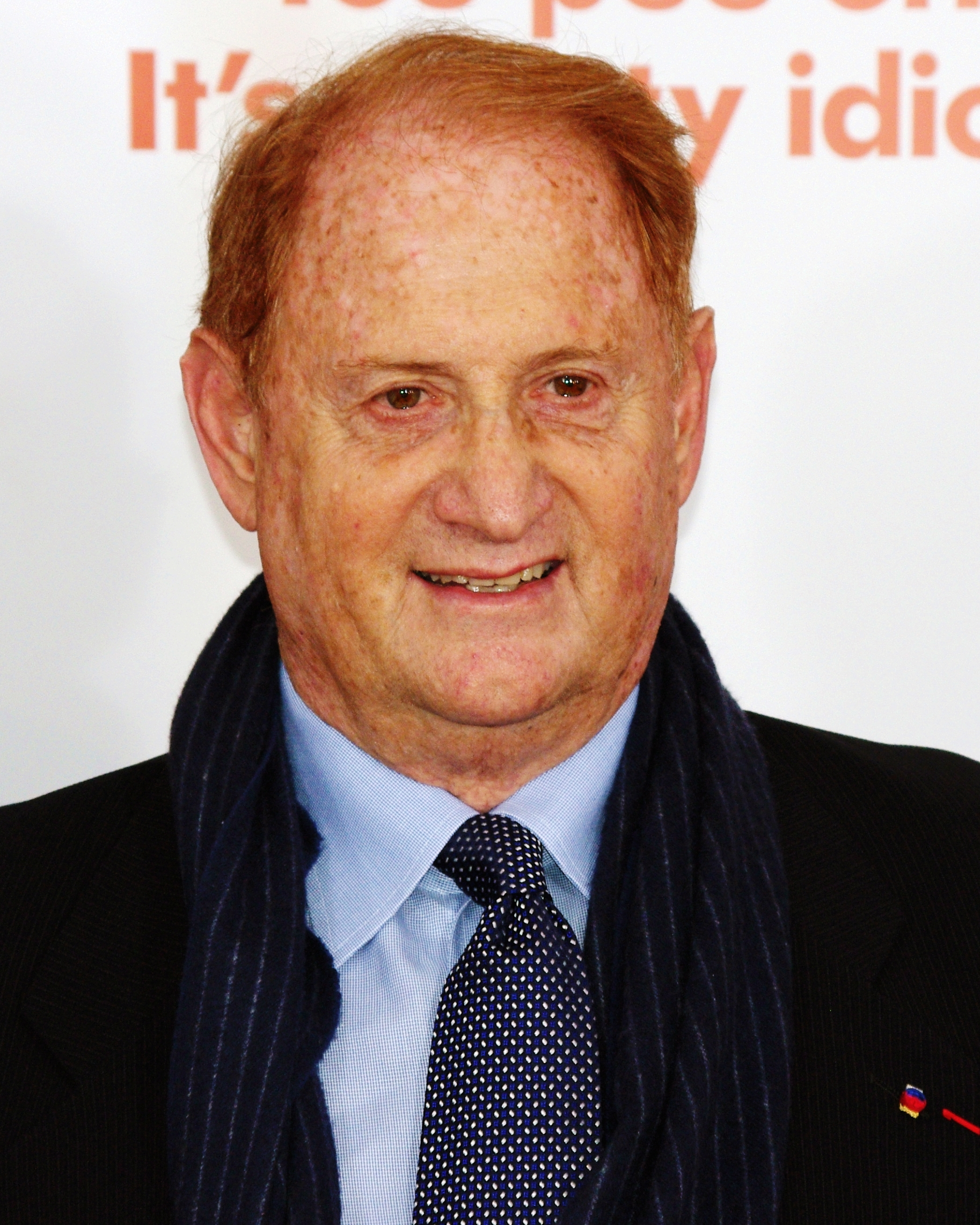
Director Kirk Jones and producer Mike Medavoy at the film's premiere.

Written by Heidi Murkoff, What to Expect When You're Expecting is a pregnancy guide released in 1984. It is a top-selling book on The New York Times Best Seller list and is considered one of the most influential books of the past twenty-five years. Additionally, it was dubbed "the bible of American pregnancy" and has sold over 20 million units worldwide. On January 14, 2010, it was announced that Lionsgate had acquired the book's worldwide distribution rights from Phoenix Pictures. Heather Hach, who was nine months pregnant at the time, was hired to write the film's screenplay "based on her pitch", which would follow the story of seven couples who experience the "ups and downs" of preparing for parenthood. David Thwaites produced it alongside Mike Medavoy and Arnie Messer. Alli Shearmur, Lionsgate's President of Motion Picture Productions, said the book is "a brand that knows no boundaries" and they were "excited about this film as the first in a potential franchise". Murkoff said she was excited to see Phoenix Pictures and Lionsgate "bring my baby to life". Medavoy, Messer and Thwaites felt that the book provides the "perfect launching point" to tell a funny story.

=== Pre-production ===
Kirk Jones directed the film. Jones had not read or heard about the book, and assumed it was a novel before receiving the script. However, he then discovered that it was in fact a pregnancy guide. Although puzzled at first, he recalled his pregnancy experience as "funny, tragic, exciting" and "hilarious", and thought combining these elements would make for a "really interesting" film. Speaking about the film's theme, he stated that "everybody's experience is different" and multiple different stories "allow the audience to share in everything that is going on" and "by sharing in what's going on and seeing so many characters, there's this energy, and there's humor and there's drama in comparing all of the stories, which are taking place at the same time". What to Expect When You're Expecting stars an ensemble cast, which focuses primarily on the five couples who are going to be first-time parents. According to Access Atlanta, the project also needed "a lot of extras who are in the family way" as well as "babies with star potential". An open casting call was held on July 9, 2011. Casting director Christopher Gray said at the time, "We need a lot of pregnant women. We want the real deal". The film also featured a number of Ethiopians, for which a casting call was issued as well. Additionally, the film contains cameos by various celebrities including, Dwyane Wade, Whitney Port, and Megan Mullally.

=== Filming ===
The film began principal photography in Atlanta on July 19, 2011. On July 26, production filmed in Midtown on Peachtree Street near High Museum and in Piedmont Park. Jones said it was "tough" organizing schedules because of the number of cast members there were. Having never "shot five simultaneous stories like this", he stated: "Through necessity we had to schedule the film so that I shot everything with Jennifer Lopez in two weeks, everything with Cameron Diaz in two weeks ... because they are not available to keep flying in from another continent for two days work and then flying back again".

=== Music ===
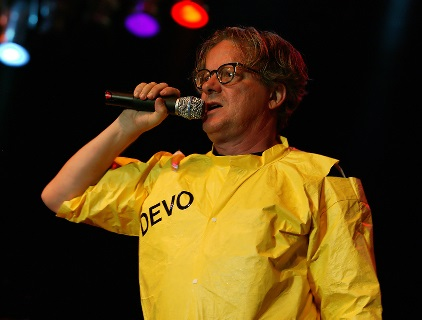
Mark Mothersbaugh scored the music for the film and on its soundtrack.

The film's score was composed by Mark Mothersbaugh. The soundtrack also contains "Dance (Disco Heat)" performed by Sylvester, "Nobody" performed by Ne-Yo, "Shivas Regal (Theme For Gypsy)" performed by Sonny Lester & His Orchestra, "Oye Como Va" performed by Kinky, "Happening" performed by Chiddy Bang, "Kellerman's Anthem" performed by Emile Bergstein Chorale, "Get Me Golden" performed by Terraplane Sun, "Home" performed by Edward Sharpe and the Magnetic Zeros, "Don't Let Your Feet Touch Ground" performed by Ash Koley, "Weightless" performed by Natasha Bedingfield, "Forever Love" performed by Alex Ebert, "Hypnotize" performed by The Notorious B.I.G., "Comin' Home Baby" performed by Mel Tormé, "Forgetting" performed by David Gray, "Never Gonna Stop" performed by The So Manys, "Inside Out" performed by Nire' AllDai, "Waiting On The Light To Change" performed by Matthew Perryman Jones, "Addicted To Love" performed by Robert Palmer, "Modern Art" performed by Black Lips, "Don't You Want Me" performed by Phil Oakey, Philip Adrian Wright and Jo Callis, "Do What You Want" performed by Daphne Willis, "Broken Sky" performed by Rob Laufer, "Why Don't We Get Drunk" performed by Jimmy Buffett, "Put Your Hands Up" performed by The MIDI Mafia, "Samba Vocalizado" performed by Luciano Perrone, "Get It Daddy" performed by Sleeper Agent, "Now Is The Start" performed by Alison Sudol, "The Hormone Song" performed by Elizabeth Banks and "Big Poppa" performed by Ernie Isley, Marvin Isley, O'Kelly Isley, Jr., Ronald Isley, Rudolph Isley, Chris Jasper and The Notorious B.I.G.

== Release ==
The film was released across 3,021 theaters on May 18, 2012, it closed on August 2, 2012.

=== Home media ===
What to Expect When You're Expecting was released on DVD and Blu-ray on September 11, 2012 by Lionsgate Home Entertainment.

== Reception ==
=== Box office ===
What to Expect When You're Expecting debuted in fifth place with $10.5 million. By the end of its run, What to Expect When You're Expecting grossed $41.2 million domestically, for a worldwide gross of $84.4 million.

=== Critical response ===
On the review aggregator website Rotten Tomatoes, 23% of 135 critics' reviews are positive, with an average rating of 4.5/10. The website's consensus reads: "The cast is stocked with likable performers, but What to Expect When You're Expecting is too disjointed—and too reliant on stock rom-com cliches—to live up to its distinguished literary namesake." Metacritic, which uses a weighted average, assigned the film a score of 41 out of 100, based on 30 critics, indicating "mixed or average" reviews. Audiences polled by CinemaScore gave the film an average grade of "B−" on an A+ to F scale.

Cara Nash of the Australian film magazine Filmink gave the film a mixed review, criticizing the storyline as not having "complexity" or "genuine conflict", but praised Lopez and Banks who "manage to find the humanity in their clichéd roles but they can't transcend all the surface-level schmaltz on display here". Peter Travers of Rolling Stone gave the film a negative review, stating that "the movie itself triggered the vomiting", but appreciated Rock, Kendrick and Crawford's performances "if you dramatically drop your expectations". Simon Miraudo of Quickflix called it "ill-conceived" and gave the film a mixed review while stating: "Despite an immensely appealing cast and a few funny moments, I would only recommend What to Expect at a 'push'. The eggs are there; someone just forgot to fertilise them."

Betsy Sharkey of the Los Angeles Times among other critics noted the confusion of the swiftly moving film, writing that "Rather than the engaging enlightenment of the source, the film becomes bloated by confusion." New York Daily News gave the film 3 and a half stars, writing "Thankfully the film, unlike being a parent, is a fairly smooth and entertaining ride that has a universal appeal to both parents and those who ever had a father or a mother", and named the scene in which Jennifer Lopez's character travels to Ethiopia to meet the child she is adopting as the film's most touching moment. The Guardian's Mike McCahill described the movie as "insight-deficient fluff".

=== Accolades ===
Award	Category	Recipient(s)	Result
ALMA Awards	Favorite Movie Actor	Rodrigo Santoro	Nominated
ALMA Awards	Favorite Movie Actress Comedy/Musical	Cameron Diaz	Nominated
ALMA Awards	Favorite Movie Actress Comedy/Musical	Jennifer Lopez	Nominated
Teen Choice Awards	Choice Movie: Comedy		Nominated
Teen Choice Awards	Choice Movie Actor: Comedy	Chris Rock	Nominated
Teen Choice Awards	Choice Movie Actress: Comedy	Cameron Diaz	Nominated
Teen Choice Awards	Choice Movie Actress: Comedy	Jennifer Lopez	Nominated
Teen Choice Awards	Choice Movie: Breakout	Joe Manganiello	Nominated
Teen Choice Awards	Choice Movie: Male Scene Stealer	Chace Crawford	Nominated
People's Choice Awards	Favorite Comedic Movie		Nominated
People's Choice Awards	Favorite Comedic Movie Actress	Cameron Diaz	Nominated
Razzie Awards	Worst Supporting Actress	Brooklyn Decker	Nominated
Razzie Awards	Worst Supporting Actress	Jennifer Lopez	Nominated
Premios Juventud	She Steals the Show	Jennifer Lopez	Won
