= OURsceneTV =

OURsceneTV is a lifestyle entertainment video site for the LGBT community, headquartered in New York City. Owned by OURscene Networks, LLC, it was founded in 2008 by Christine Alloro to "bridge gaps for the LGBT community to the rest of the world, and also give those who are closeted a sense that they can come out.

== Description ==
The site features original programming in short-form video format, and includes red carpet coverage, celebrity interviews, lifestyle segments, and a coverage of New York and Los Angeles gay-friendly businesses and nightlife.

In October 2009 OURsceneTV was recognized by writer Cathy Brooks of The Huffington Post as a “catalyst in the evolution of LGBT public expression.” Brooks writes that OURsceneTV has a "distinctly Entertainment Tonight/Access Hollywood feel," albeit from an LGBT perspective, balanced with more socially conscious features such as the site's series, "Stonewall: Profiles of Pride," tackling serious topics ranging from "issues facing the trans(gendered) community, gay parents, immigration and adoption laws, and safeguarding your finances."

OURsceneTV segments have been featured by The San Francisco Chronicle, The Village Voice, Towleroad.com, AfterEllen.com, and Queerty.

Celebrity Interviews include Lady Gaga, Sean Penn, Mary Louise Parker, Cyndi Lauper, Marc Jacobs, Michael Bloomberg, Cheyenne Jackson, Chace Crawford, The Indigo Girls, Tyra Banks, Eve, Alan Cumming, Whoopi Goldberg, Wilson Cruz, Candis Cayne, and more.
