= Arlene Eisenberg =

American author

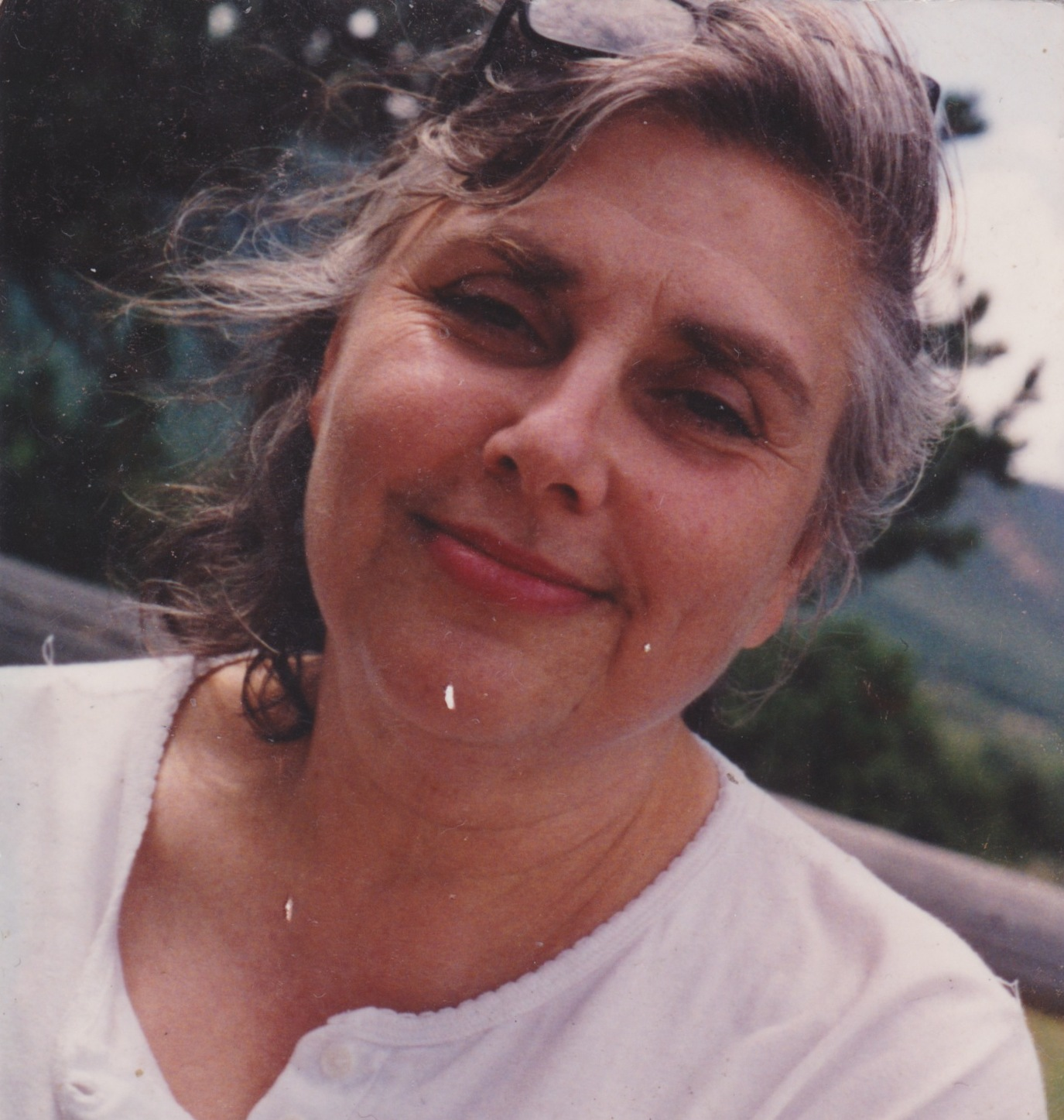
- Arlene Eisenberg with husband Howard
- Born: Arlene Leila Scharaga; June 8, 1934; New York City, United States
- Died: February 8, 2001 (aged 66)
- Education: Queens College
- Occupations: Author, journalist
- Years active: 1957–2001
- Notable work: What to Expect When You're Expecting; What to Expect The First Year; The Recovery Book; What to Expect Foundation
- Spouse: Howard Eisenberg
- Children: Sandee Hathaway; Evan Eisenberg; Heidi Murkoff
- Awards: National Council of Christians and Jews: Gold Medal for the Look Magazine Cover Story: "The Christian War on Anti-Semitism"; 1993 Markie Award: Recovery Book
- Honours: Doctor of Humane Letters, Hunter College
- Website: Amazon Author Central

Arlene Leila Scharaga Eisenberg (June 8, 1934 – February 8, 2001) was an author best known for her contributions to parenting to self-help literature. Eisenberg co-wrote what has been described as the "bible of American pregnancy," What to Expect When You're Expecting (1984). The book's success led to the What To Expect parenting series, which as of 2012, has sold over 34 million copies in 30 languages.

Eisenberg married Howard Eisenberg at 18. Howard Eisenberg, then, a publicist for singer Eddie Fisher, encouraged Eisenberg to write. With Arlene's newfound inspiration, the duo soon began writing together, publishing articles and books in the major media. As of 2016, Howard Eisenberg continues to write in tribute to Arlene's honor.

== Legacy ==
Eisenberg died from breast cancer February 8, 2001. Eisenberg's collaborator and daughter Heidi Murkoff continues to write new books and update the earlier books in the What to Expect series with up to date material. In 2000, The What to Expect Foundation was created by Eisenberg's book team to provide educational resources to needy families.

== Awards and honors ==
- In 2001, Eisenberg was posthumously awarded the 2001 Career Achievement Award by the American Society of Journalists and Authors
- In 2000, Eisenberg, along with her husband was awarded an honorary Doctor of Humane Letters from Hunter College
- In 1993, Eisenberg along with her husband won First prize winner of the 1993 Markie Award, sponsored by the National Foundation for Alcoholism and Addiction Communication (NFAAC) for the Recovery Book
- In 1965, Eisenberg won the Gold Medal by the National Council of Christian and Jews, for the Look Magazine cover story: "The Christian War on Anti-Semitism"

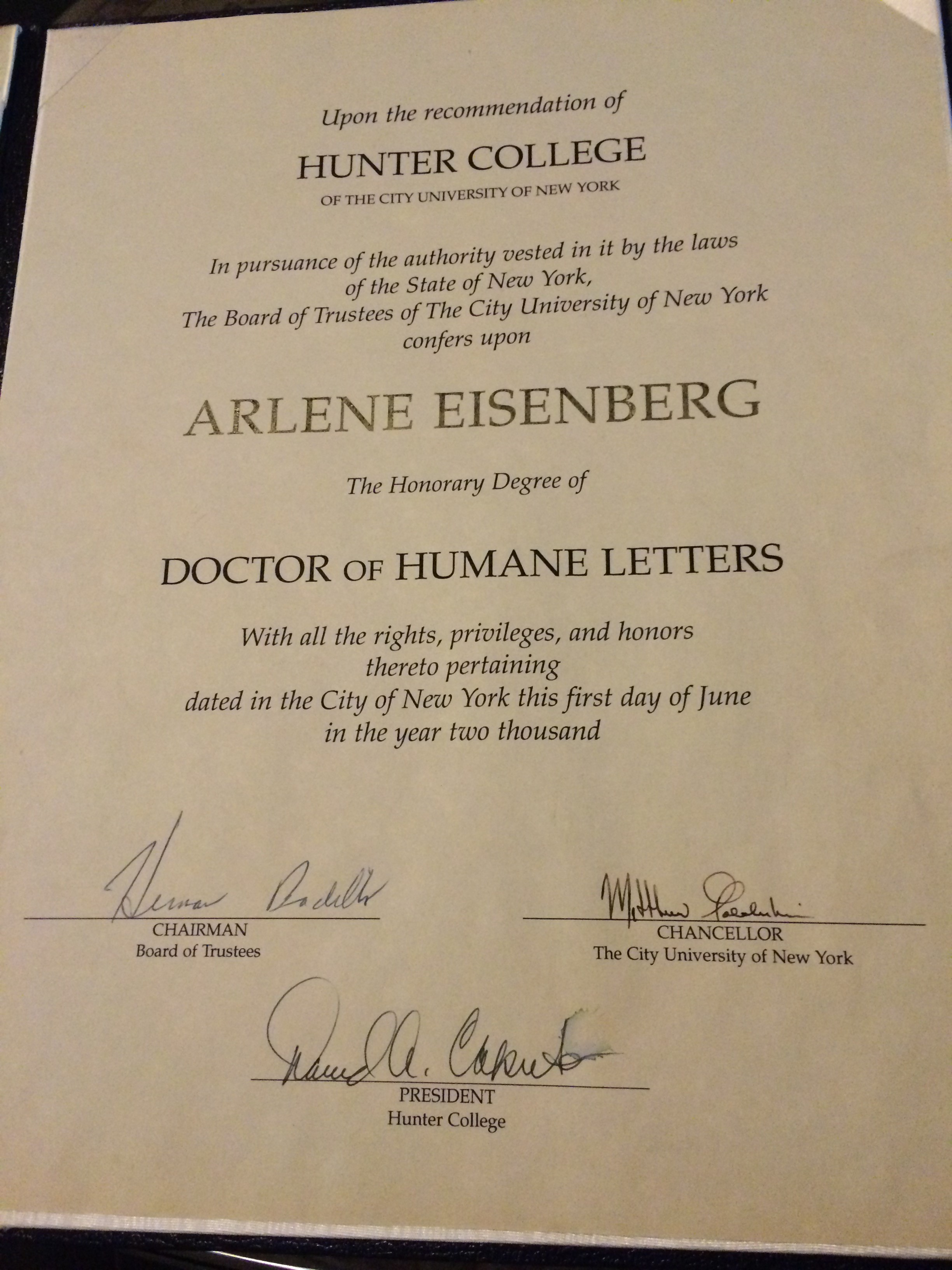
The honoris causa doctorate received by Arlene Eisenberg from Hunter College (2000).

== Bibliography ==
- What to Expect the Toddler Years (1996)
- The Recovery Book (1992)
- What to Expect the First Year (1989)
- What to Eat When You're Expecting (1986)
- Night Calls (1986)
- What to Expect When You're Expecting (1984)
- Special Guest Cookbook (1982)
- Alive & Well: Decisions in Health (1979)
