= Twelve (2010 film) =

2010 film

- Theatrical release poster
- Directed by: Joel Schumacher
- Screenplay by: Jordan Melamed
- Based on: Twelve by Nick McDonell
- Produced by: Sidonie Dumas; Ted Field; Charlie Corwin; Jordan Melamed; Robert Salerno
- Starring: Chace Crawford; Rory Culkin; Curtis Jackson; Emily Meade; Emma Roberts
- Narrated by: Kiefer Sutherland
- Cinematography: Steven Fierberg
- Edited by: Paul Zucker; Gordon Grinberg
- Music by: Harry Gregson-Williams
- Production companies: Gaumont; Radar Pictures; Original Media
- Distributed by: Hannover House (United States); Gaumont (France)
- Release dates: January 29, 2010 (Sundance); August 6, 2010 (United States); September 8, 2010 (France)
- Running time: 94 minutes
- Countries: United States; France
- Language: English
- Budget: $5 million
- Box office: $2.6 million

Twelve is a 2010 teen crime drama film directed by Joel Schumacher from a screenplay by Jordan Melamed, based on Nick McDonell's 2002 novel of the same name. The film follows a young drug dealer whose luxurious lifestyle falls apart after his cousin is murdered and his best friend is arrested for the crime. It stars Chace Crawford, Rory Culkin, Curtis Jackson, Emily Meade, and Emma Roberts, with Erik Per Sullivan in his film final role before his retirement.

Produced by Gaumont and Radar Pictures, the film premiered at the Sundance Film Festival on January 29, 2010, and later released theatrically on August 6, 2010. A critical and commercial failure, it grossed $110,238 during its opening weekend and made $2.6 million worldwide, against a budget of $5 million, in addition to being panned by critics.

== Plot ==
On the Upper East Side, White Mike, once a wealthy, carefree teenager, now struggles to scrape out a living as a marijuana dealer; he deals to his former classmates. His mother died a year earlier, her treatment consuming his family's wealth and leaving Mike emotionally scarred. Mike's friend, Molly, does not know he is a drug dealer. Mike's supplier, Lionel, sells the addictive drug cocktail "Twelve" to Mike's cousin, Charlie. Being unable to pay for the drug, Charlie attempts to mug Lionel, but Lionel shoots Charlie as well as an innocent observer, Nana. Hunter, a friend of Mike and Charlie's, is taken into custody for the murders.

Several other young residents of this wealthy Manhattan scene are introduced at a party as customers of White Mike, including Tobias, Yvette, Sara, Jessica, and the party's host, Chris. Jessica tries Twelve for the first time, leading to an addiction. During the party, Chris' older brother, Claude, a sociopath and weapon collector, returns home after breaking out of rehab. Their mother discovers this and threatens to call the police. Sara manipulates Chris into throwing a huge birthday party for her just before the end of spring break. She and her friends invite everyone they know to make Sara's birthday "famous".

Out of drugs and money, Jessica asks Lionel to stop by Sara's party so she can buy more Twelve. Tobias meets Molly during a drug deal with Mike and invites her to Sara's party. Mike sees this and calls him to get him away from Molly. Mike meets up with her, and she tells him about Tobias and the party. Molly suggests visiting Mike at his job, which Mike denies before running off. Molly decides to go to the party.

As the party starts, Claude locks himself in his room, practicing with his weapons. Lionel arrives but is furious with Jessica, as she does not have the promised money. Since she has no money, she first offers him oral sex, then to have sex with him, which Lionel agrees. Mike's father calls him to deliver the news that Charlie is dead, and his body is identified. Mike tries to call Molly, but she does not answer her phone. He goes to the party to locate her but is stopped by several drunk party-goers. He accidentally stumbles upon Jessica and Lionel having sex.

Startled, Lionel begins to draw out a gun, which Mike recognizes as Charlie's. As Mike starts to accuse Lionel of the murder, Lionel shoots him, causing Claude to pull out his weapons and begin shooting up the party. Teenagers rush out of the party, but many others are killed, including Lionel. Claude hears police sirens and runs outside to die in a suicide by cop fashion. As Sara dies, her last thought is how this will make her famous. Mike wakes up in the hospital, and Molly reprimands him for his drug-dealing livelihood. He wants to call her when sent home, but she says no. Mike visits Nana's mother, and together, they connect over their shared grief. Mike comes to terms with his mother's death.

== Cast ==
- Chace Crawford as Michael "White Mike"
  - Jack Kimball as Young Michael "White Mike"
- Rory Culkin as Chris Kenton
- Curtis Jackson as Lionel
- Emily Meade as Jessica Brayson
- Emma Roberts as Molly Norton
- Esti Ginzburg as Sara Ludlow
- Billy Magnussen as Claude Kenton
- Jeremy Allen White as Charlie
- Philip Ettinger as Hunter McCulloch
- Nico Tortorella as Tobias
- Ethan Peck as Sean
- Chanel Banks as Shelly
- Zoë Kravitz as Gabby
- Maxx Brawer as Andrew
- Jermaine Crawford as Nana
- Alexander Flores as Arturo
- Dionne Audain as Nana's Mother
- Liam McMullan as Royal
- Damian Young as Matt McCulloch
- Charles Austin Saxton as Mark Rothko
- Finn Wittrock as Warren
- Erik Per Sullivan as Timmy
- Cody Horn as Alyssa
- Isiah Whitlock as Detective Dumont
- Gregg Bello as Detective Keminski
- Ako as Mrs. Fong
- Ellen Barkin as Mrs. Brayson
- Kiefer Sutherland as The Narrator

== Release ==
Twelve premiered at the 2010 Sundance Film Festival.

The film opened on August 6, 2010, and earned a domestic total of $183,920 in a release of a mere two weeks. The film grossed $2,299,357 in foreign territories, adding up to $2,483,277. Based on an estimated $5 million budget, the film is a box office bomb.

== Critical reception ==
The film was panned by critics, currently holding a 3% rating on the review aggregator website Rotten Tomatoes, based on 29 reviews. The site's critical consensus reads: "As pretentious as it is hopelessly clichéd, this Twelve is closer to zero." On Metacritic, the film has a 22/100 rating based on 13 critics, indicating "generally unfavorable reviews".

A 2010 Gawker article asked if it was "the worst movie in the history of Sundance." In his review in The New York Times, Stephen Holden writes:

Early in Twelve, the narrator sums up the film's nihilistic milieu in a world-weary observation borrowed from the novel: "It's all about want. Nobody needs anything here." I would add, nobody needs to see Twelve, as "controversial" or "shocking" (to drop another adjective that has lost its mojo) as it strains to be.

== Home media ==
The film was released on DVD and Blu-ray on December 28, 2010.
