= Deborah Elliott Deutschman =

American writer

- Occupation: Writer
- Parent(s): Paul Deutschman; Louise Tolliver Deutschman
- Website: www.deborahelliottdeutschman.com

Deborah Elliott Deutschman is an American writer.

She is the author of the novel "Signals" published by Seaview Books/Simon & Schuster (1978) and PEI paperbacks (1980). Daughter of Paul Deutschman, a writer and journalist, and Louise Tolliver Deutschman, art curator and gallery director. She currently works and lives between New York City and Paris. Her poems and short stories have appeared, over the years, in a number of places, including The New Yorker, The Alaska Quarterly Review, Carolina Quarterly, Gargoyle, The New Criterion, New York Quarterly and Poet Lore; and translations in French literary reviews, recently in Revue Rue Saint Ambroise and Sarrazine.
