= Rocky Mountain Magazine =

Magazine published in Denver, CO

Rocky Mountain Magazine was a regional monthly magazine published in Denver, CO from 1979-1982. The magazine featured many notable Western writers and contributors, including Edward Abbey, Thomas McGuane, Tim Cahill, William Kittredge, and US Olympic skier, Billy Kidd. In 1982, the magazine won the National Magazine Award for general excellence.

== History ==
The publication was founded by Terence Y. Sieg, who served as publisher and, later, editor-in-chief. In its first year, Terry McDonell, an alum of Rolling Stone who went on to be the founding editor of Men's Journal, edited the magazine.
