= Nick McDonell =

American writer (born 1984)

- Born: Robert Nicholas McDonell; February 18, 1984 (age 42); New York City, New York, U.S.
- Occupations: Author; journalist; screenwriter; producer; novelist; researcher
- Parent: Terry McDonell (father)
- Relatives: Thomas McDonell (brother)
- Writing career
- Language: English
- Genres: Fiction, journalism, screenwriting
- Notable works: Twelve, The Third Brother

Robert Nicholas McDonell (born February 18, 1984) is an American writer who has worked as a journalist, screenwriter, producer, novelist and researcher.

== Personal life ==
McDonell was born in 1984 in New York City and raised there. McDonell attended the Buckley School, the Riverdale Country School, and graduated from Harvard College in January 2007. In June 2012, he received a graduate degree in International Relations from Oxford University.

His mother, Joanie, is a writer, and his father, Terry McDonell, is managing editor of Sports Illustrated. His brother is actor Thomas McDonell. His father was once managing editor of Rolling Stone, where Hunter S. Thompson was a contributing editor and a friend; Thompson gave a blurb to McDonell when Twelve was published, as did writers Richard Price and Joan Didion, both personal friends of the family. Morgan Entrekin, president and publisher of Grove/Atlantic, which published the book, is also a friend of the family.

== Works ==
=== Twelve ===
McDonell wrote the novel Twelve in 2002, when he was 17. The subject of the novel is disaffection, despair, drug use and violence among a group of wealthy Manhattan teenagers during Winter break. The publication of the novel at such a young age was the subject of many articles in high-profile publications such The New Yorker and Entertainment Weekly.

Twelve has been translated into over twenty languages, was on all major American best-seller lists, UK bestseller lists and was number one on German bestseller lists. A motion picture adaptation of the same name was released in 2010. The film was directed by Joel Schumacher and starred Kiefer Sutherland and Chace Crawford.

=== The Third Brother ===
Also published in the UK and translated into many languages, Nick McDonell's second novel, The Third Brother (ISBN 0-8021-1802-X), was released in September 2005. The New York Times called it "a haunting tale of brotherly love."

Divided into three parts, the first describes the 19-year-old protagonist Mike on a revelatory assignment in Bangkok. Mike is working for an old friend of his father. (McDonell himself interned for Karl Taro Greenfeld of Time Asia. Greenfeld later worked for McDonell's father at Sports Illustrated.) The second part of the novel takes place on September 11, 2001, as Mike searches for his brother; in the final part, Mike returns to college after tragedy strikes his family.

=== Guerre a Harvard ===
Published by Flammarion in 2008, this work recorded the reactions of university students from 2003 to 2008 to the Iraq War involving American armed forces.

=== An Expensive Education ===
With the publication in August 2009 of his third novel, An Expensive Education, reviewers compared McDonell to both Graham Greene and John le Carré. Amazon.com recommended the novel, and all three of McDonell's books were praised in a profile which appeared in The New York Times on August 2, 2009. The review in The Washington Post on August 12, 2009, said: "Now 25, McDonell has reached an age at which it is not so freakish to write a good book, which is fortunate because he has done it again." The review goes on to say, "As he's shown in his previous novels, he can be a ruthless chronicler of America's aristocratic culture." And: "One of the fascinations of this novel is how effectively it tracks distant events that resonate with one another around the world."

=== The End of Major Combat Operations ===
Published in April 2010, McDonell's fourth book reports about the war in Iraq.

=== Green on Blue ===
A TIME e-book published in 2013 about the war in Afghanistan and numerous stark instances of American military casualties there. It was described as being reminiscent of Sebastian Junger and Jim Frederick.

=== White City ===
AMC, the cable television network, decided in 2015 to cancel production of this proposed television series from McDonell, Stephen Gaghan, Tom Freston, and John Dempsey. The AMC series was planned to be a fictional television series about expats in the capital city Kabul, Afghanistan during times of foreign military activity in the region, based on McDonell and Dempsey's own experiences. McDonell was credited as a screenwriter and producer on this proposed television series. White City was already used as the name for other Hollywood projects in the past, so the title of the series was deemed too confusing to television and film audiences. White City did not move forward because network executives viewed it as being too similar to concurrent Hollywood projects like the hit Showtime premium cable series Homeland, the popular FX cable series Tyrant, and NBC series State of Affairs. A lack of star power among the cast appearing in the pilot led to production being shut down without any episodes airing.

=== The Civilization of Perpetual Movement: Nomadism in World Politics ===
Arriving in April 2016, McDonell's book published by Hurst in the UK is a work of non-fiction examining the experiences of nomads in remote locations from Africa to Asia. McDonell has spent years researching and studying such peoples to understand their circumstances. He traveled all around the world for research to rural locations in developing countries such as the Rift Valley, Afghanistan and more.

=== The Bodies in Person ===
Published by Blue Rider Press in 2018, The Bodies in Person is subtitled An Account of Civilian Casualties in American Wars and has been written from many hours of oral history interviews with soldiers and others involved in wars in Iraq and Afghanistan.

=== The Council of Animals ===
A short illustrated book about wild animals deciding the fate of humans in the face of climate change, The Council of Animals was published by Henry Holt and Co. in 2021.

== Praise ==
The New York Times book critic and Pulitzer Prize winner Michiko Kakutani described McDonell's debut novel Twelve as being "As fast as speed, as relentless as acid." Referring to his second book, Jennifer Egan in The New York Times Book Review wrote, "In The Third Brother, McDonell delivers another remarkable novel." The first pre-publication review of McDonell's third novel, An Expensive Education, appeared in Publishers Weekly where it was compared to "le Carré's better works."

McDonell has also been acclaimed for his book La Guerre a Harvard published in France in 2009, and articles from Darfur for Harper's Magazine in 2009, and for Time from Iraq.
