= Chace Crawford =

American actor (born 1985)

- Crawford in 2026
- Born: Christopher Chace Crawford; July 18, 1985 (age 41); Lubbock, Texas, U.S.
- Occupation: Actor
- Years active: 2006–present
- Relatives: Tony Romo (brother-in-law)

Christopher Chace Crawford (born July 18, 1985) is an American actor. He is known for his television portrayals of Nate Archibald on the teen drama series Gossip Girl (2007–2012) and of Kevin / The Deep in the satirical superhero series The Boys (2019–2026) and the resulting franchise. He is also known for starring in the films The Covenant (2006), The Haunting of Molly Hartley (2008), Twelve (2011), and What to Expect When You're Expecting (2012).

== Early life and education ==
Crawford was born on July 18, 1985 in Lubbock, Texas. His father, Chris, is a dermatologist, and his mother, Dana, is a teacher. He has a younger sister, former Miss Missouri USA winner and Miss USA contestant Candice Crawford. Crawford was raised as a Southern Baptist. While his father was a medical student, Chace lived in Bloomington, Minnesota, for four years and attended Ridgeview Elementary School. When his father completed his training, the family moved back to Texas and settled in Plano, a suburb of Dallas.

During high school, he worked in an Abercrombie & Fitch store and modeled for Hollister. He graduated from Trinity Christian Academy in Addison, Texas, in 2003. Following graduation, Crawford attended Pepperdine University, studying broadcast journalism and marketing, but he dropped out after a few semesters to focus on his acting career. He temporarily worked as a car valet to make ends meet.

== Career ==
=== 2006–2012: Beginnings and Gossip Girl ===
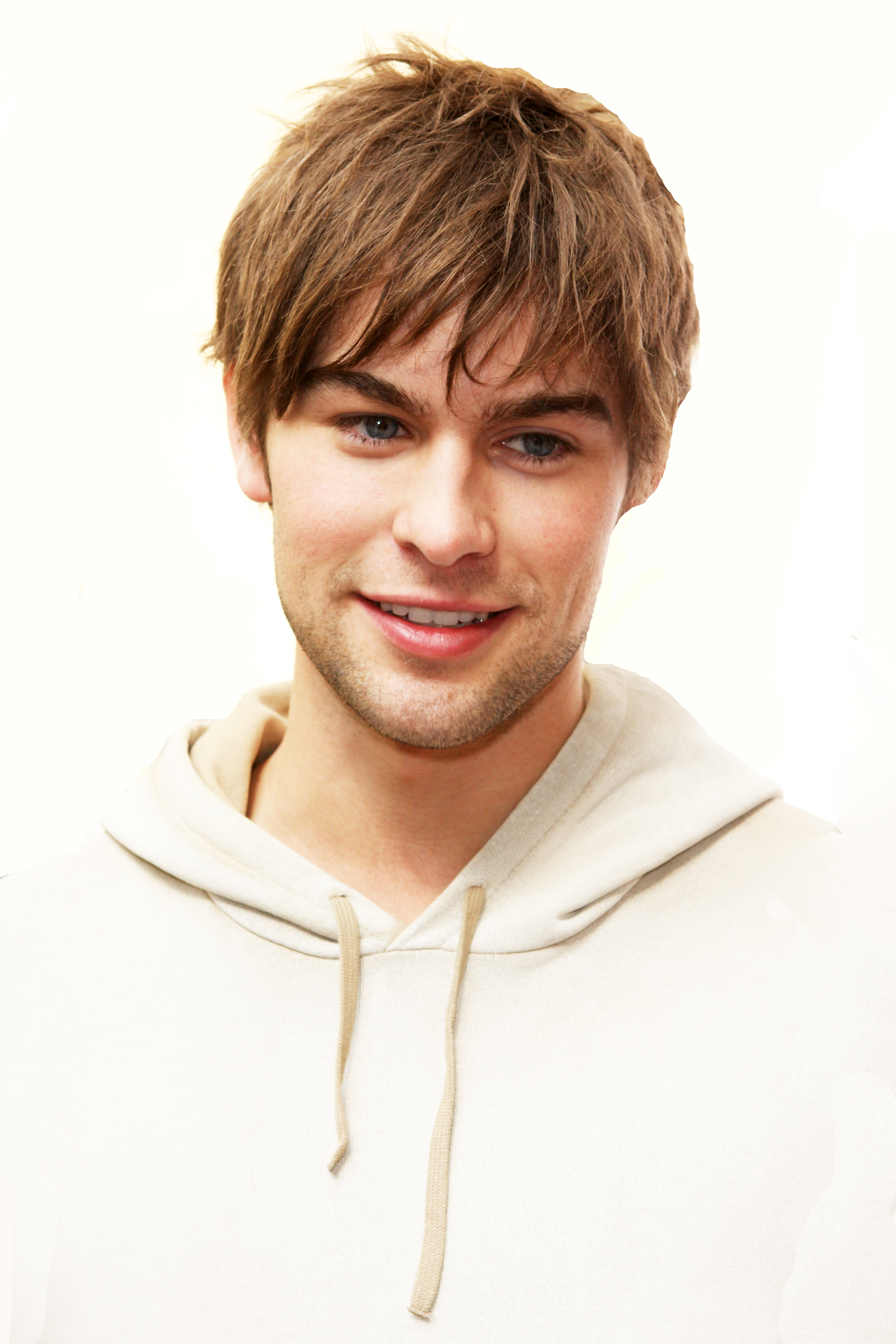
Crawford at Nintendo's Mario Kart Wii launch party, April 2008

Crawford made his film debut in the 2006 supernatural horror-thriller The Covenant, as Tyler Simms. In March 2007, he landed the role of main character Nate Archibald on The CW's teen drama series Gossip Girl, making his television debut. In 2008, Crawford co-starred in the crime-thriller Loaded, and portrayed the lead role in the supernatural horror film The Haunting of Molly Hartley. The following year, he played English singer-songwriter Leona Lewis' boyfriend in the music video for her single "I Will Be", which was released in January 2009. That same year, Crawford was named "Summer's Hottest Bachelor" by People.

Crawford has also done a public service announcement for Do Something's Teens for Jeans campaign. He then portrayed the lead role, a drug dealer named White Mike, in the teen crime drama film Twelve, directed by Joel Schumacher. Based on Nick McDonell's novel of the same name, the film premiered at Sundance Film Festival on January 31, 2010. He was tapped to play the lead in the 2011 remake of Footloose, even beginning rehearsals for the role, before dropping out after a number of weeks. Kenny Wormald was eventually cast for the role.

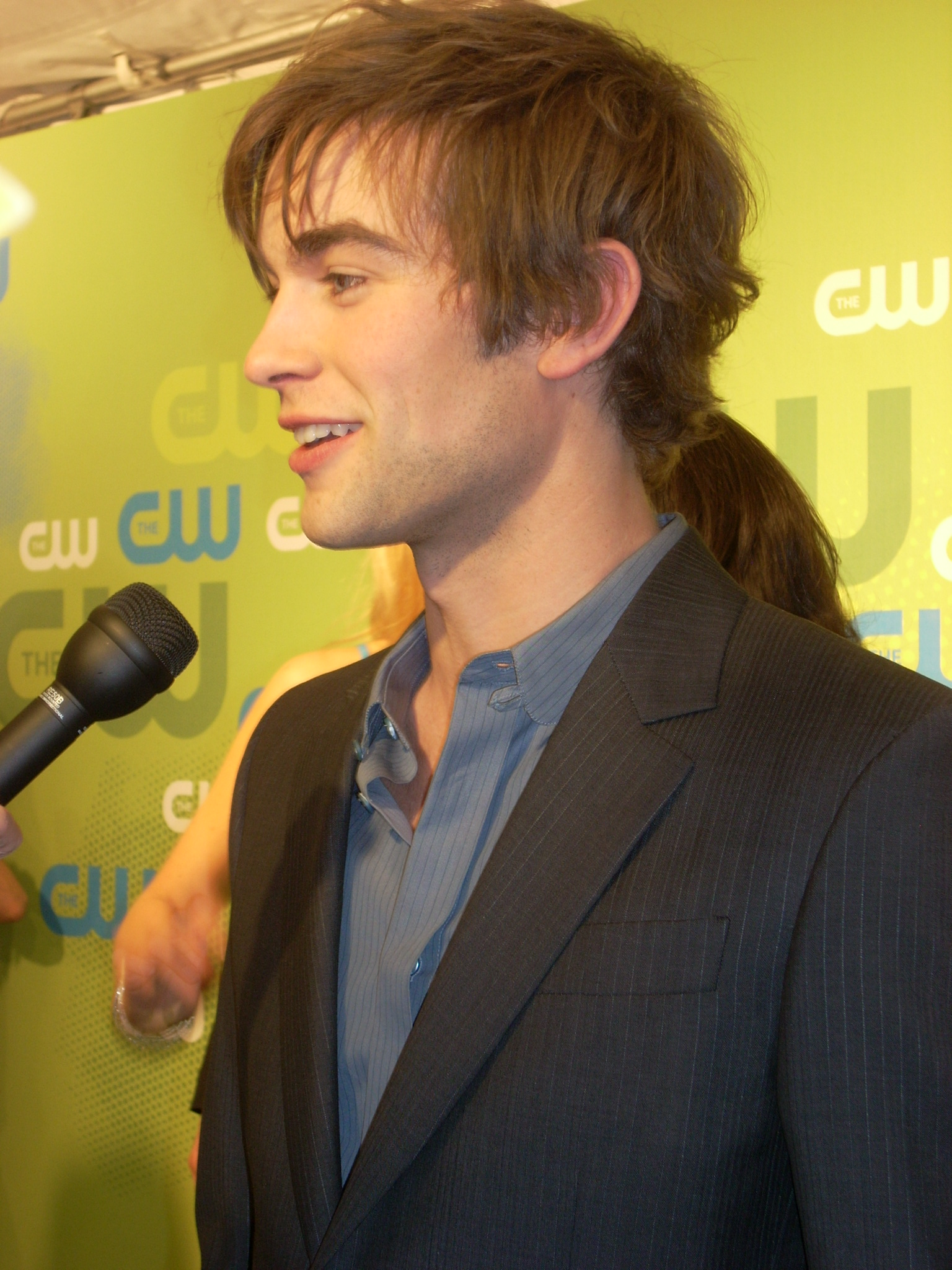
Crawford at The CW's upfront presentation, May 2009

In 2011, Crawford starred in the film Peace, Love & Misunderstanding alongside Jane Fonda and Catherine Keener. He portrayed a war-protesting butcher named Cole, a love interest of one of the main characters. In 2012, Crawford starred alongside Cameron Diaz and Jennifer Lopez in What to Expect When You're Expecting, directed by Kirk Jones. It is a film adaptation of the book of the same name by Heidi Murkoff. Crawford played Marco in one of the film's interlocking stories. His character reunites with an old flame after a turf war between their food trucks, and they embark on a journey together in the wake of a surprise pregnancy.

=== 2013–present: Film roles and The Boys ===
In January 2014, Crawford signed on to guest-star on the 100th episode of the Fox comedy-drama series Glee as Biff McIntosh, Quinn Fabray's (Dianna Agron) new boyfriend, which aired on March 18, 2014. In March 2014, Crawford landed the lead role of Cooper Pollard in the independent comedy Mountain Men. The film follows two brothers on a trip to the mountain to look for their missing father, but they get stuck there and have to work together to return home. The film co-stars Tyler Labine.

In April 2014, it was reported that Crawford had landed the lead role of Jacob Martin in the psychological thriller film Eloise (2017), directed by Robert Legato and written by Chris Borrelli. The film is about four friends who break into an asylum so Jacob can get an inheritance of the death certificate. Once inside the asylum, they discover the truth about their tragic past. It also stars Eliza Dushku, Brandon T. Jackson, and P.J. Byrne. On March 11, 2015, it was reported that Crawford had been cast in ABC's primetime soap opera Blood & Oil, portraying the lead role of Billy LeFever. The series was cancelled after a short run of 10 episodes.

In 2016, Crawford played the role of Arthur Barone in the independent sports comedy-drama film Undrafted, written and directed by Joe Mazzello. Based on the true story of a promising young baseball player, the project was filmed at Dunsmore Park in La Crescenta, California. Also that year, he had a minor role in the film Rules Don't Apply, written and directed by Warren Beatty.

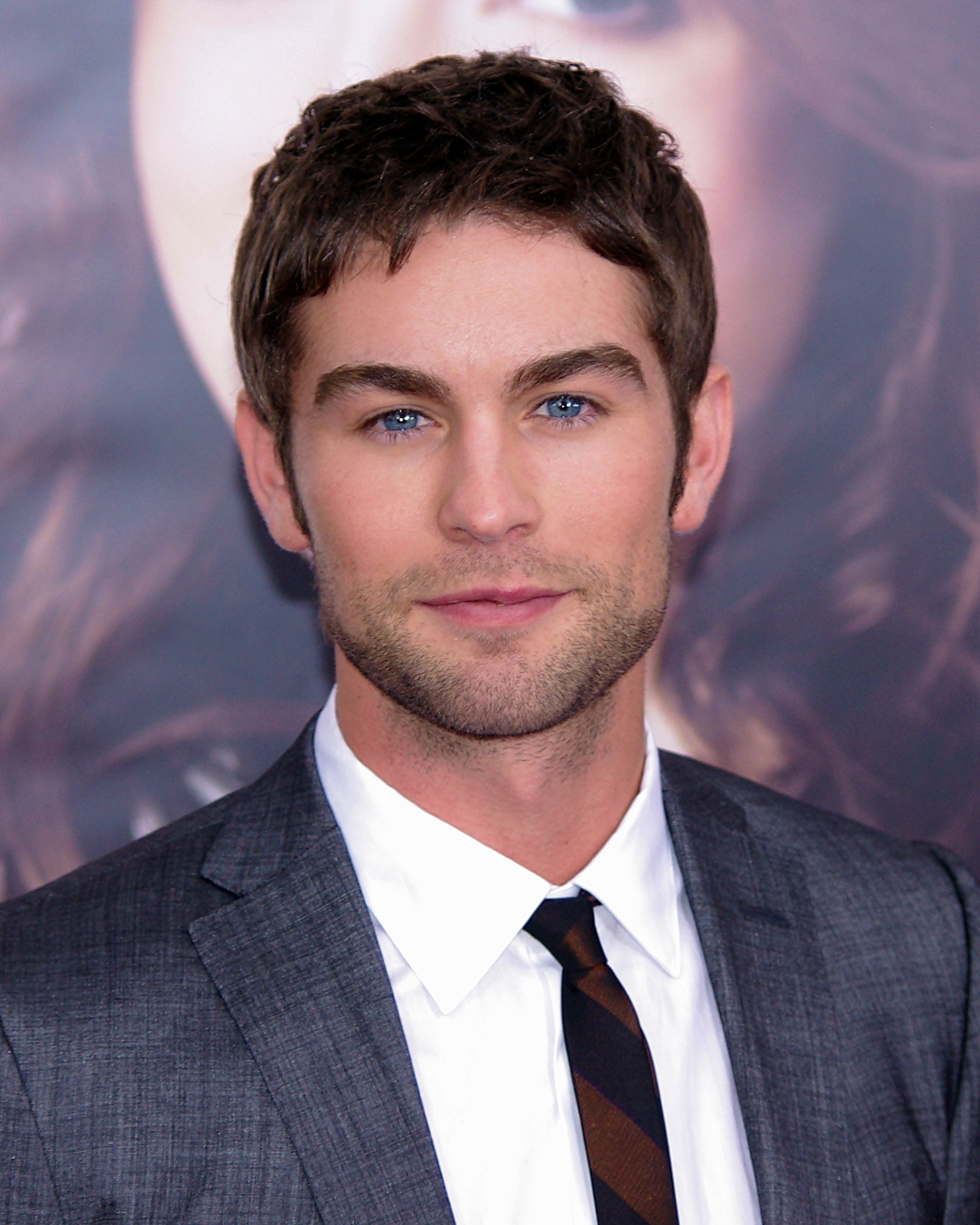
Crawford in 2012

In April 2016, it was announced that Crawford had landed the role of Egon in the comedy film I Do... Until I Don't opposite Amber Heard and Ed Helms. The film was written and directed by Lake Bell. In the same month, TheWrap reported that he would perform in a live-reading of the Black List script College Republicans, portraying the role of John F. Kinney. The reading took place at the Montalbán Theater on April 23, 2016. In March 2017, it was announced that Crawford had joined the cast of the comedy television show Casual for the recurring role of Byron. The same year, he signed on to star in the crime movie Riptide as Landen and comedy film All About Nina (2018) as Joe.

In January 2018, it was announced that Crawford has been cast as Kevin Moskowitz / The Deep in The Boys (2019–2026), the Amazon Studios adaptation of Garth Ennis and Darick Robertson's comic book of the same name. The show had five seasons. In March, he was cast in the Charles Manson biopic drama-thriller film Charlie Says (2018) as murderer Tex Watson. In March 2019, Crawford was announced to join Lily Collins in Vaughn Stein's thriller Inheritance (2020). In the same year, he starred in thriller Nighthawks (2019).

In August 2021, Crawford was announced to star alongside Nina Dobrev in ensemble comedy Reunion from director Chris Nelson. On October 9, Crawford did an uncredited cameo on a Saturday Night Live (SNL) episode in a parody skit of The Bachelorette. In December, Crawford was announced to voice act in the English-language version of Mamoru Hosoda's 2021 science-fantasy anime, Belle. It was released the following month alongside the Japanese-language version on January 14, 2022. In February 2022, it was announced that Crawford would develop a football drama at Showtime, alongside former Dallas Cowboys quarterback Tony Romo, who is also Crawford's brother-in-law, and Yellowjackets executive producer Drew Comins. In March 2022, Crawford reprised the role of his The Boys character, Kevin Moskowitz/The Deep, in the fifth episode of its adult animated anthology spin-off, The Boys Presents: Diabolical.

== Personal life ==
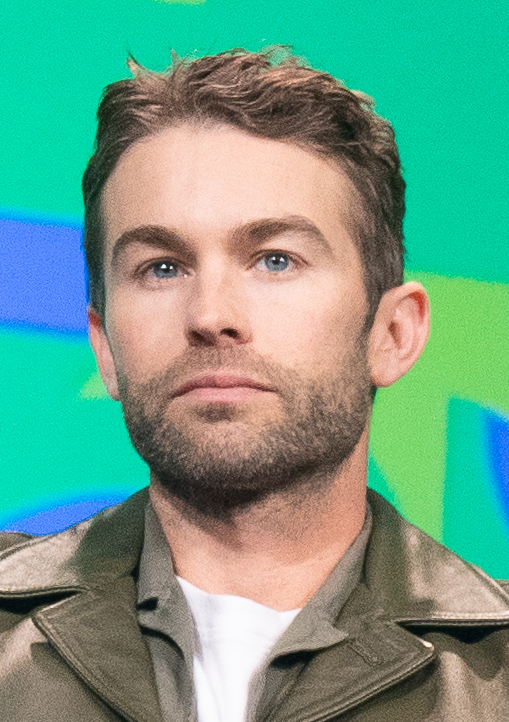
Crawford in 2022

Crawford shared an apartment with his Gossip Girl co-star Ed Westwick in Chelsea, Manhattan, at the beginning of the series in 2007 until July 2009, when Crawford moved out to rent an apartment in the Wall Street area. In 2010, Crawford was arrested in Plano, Texas, for possession of marijuana. Because it did not involve a drug dealer or a bag of weed, he cut a deal to pay for his arrest with probation and community service in 2011. Crawford's brother in-law is former Dallas Cowboys quarterback Tony Romo, who Crawford's sister, Candice, married in 2011. He practices Transcendental Meditation, which he says is like "a natural Xanax".

== Filmography ==
Key
†	Denotes projects that have not yet been released

=== Film ===
Year	Title	Role	Notes	Ref.
2006	Long Lost Son	Matthew Williams / Mark Halloran	Television film	
2006	The Covenant	Tyler Simms		
2008	Loaded	Hayden Price		
2008	The Haunting of Molly Hartley	Joseph Young		
2010	Twelve	Michael "White Mike"		
2011	Peace, Love & Misunderstanding	Cole		
2012	What to Expect When You're Expecting	Marco		
2014	Mountain Men	Cooper Pollard		
2016	Undrafted	Arthur Barone		
2016	Rules Don't Apply	Young Actor		
2016	Eloise	Jacob Martin		
2017	I Do... Until I Don't	Egon		
2018	All About Nina	Joe		
2018	Charlie Says	Charles "Tex" Watson		
2019	Nighthawks	Stan		
2020	Inheritance	William Monroe		
2024	Reunion	Mathew Danbury		
2026	Super Troopers 3 †	Baker Buchanan	Completed	
TBA	Strobe †	TBA	Post-production	

=== Television ===
Year	Title	Role	Notes
2007–2012	Gossip Girl	Nate Archibald	Main role
2008–2010	Family Guy	Various	Voice role; 4 episodes
2009	Robot Chicken	John Connor	Voice role; episode: "Cannot Be Erased, So Sorry"
2014	Glee	Biff McIntosh	Episode: "100"
2015	Blood & Oil	Billy LeFever	Main role
2017	Casual	Byron	2 episodes
2019–2026	The Boys	Kevin Kohler / The Deep	Main role; 40 episodes
2021	Saturday Night Live	Himself	Episode: "Kim Kardashian West / Halsey" (uncredited cameo)
2022	The Boys Presents: Diabolical	Kevin Kohler / The Deep	Voice role; episode: "BFFs"
2023	Gen V	Kevin Kohler / The Deep	2 episodes

=== Web series ===
- Vought News Network: Seven on 7 with Cameron Coleman (2021), as Kevin Kohler / The Deep

== Awards and nominations ==
Year	Award	Category	Work	Result	Ref.
2008	Teen Choice Award	Choice TV: Breakout Star Male	Gossip Girl	Won	
2008	Teen Choice Award	Choice TV Actor: Drama	Gossip Girl	Nominated	
2009	Teen Choice Award	Choice Male Hottie	Himself	Nominated	
2009	Teen Choice Award	Choice TV Actor: Drama	Gossip Girl	Won	
2010	Teen Choice Award	Choice TV Actor: Drama	Gossip Girl	Won	
2011	People's Choice Award	Favorite TV Drama Actor	Gossip Girl	Nominated	
2011	Teen Choice Award	Choice TV Actor: Drama	Gossip Girl	Won	
2012	Teen Choice Award	Choice Movie: Male Scene Stealer	What to Expect When You're Expecting	Nominated	
2016	People's Choice Award	Favorite Actor in a New TV Series	Blood & Oil	Nominated	
