= Louise Tolliver Deutschman =

Louise Tolliver Deutschman (1916–2009) was a Director and Curator in the Arts.

== Life and career ==
Louise Tolliver Deutschman was born in Taylorville, Illinois, earned a B.A. degree in Languages and Journalism from MacMurray College in Jacksonville, Ill - Graduate work in Journalism and Advertising at Northwestern University, Chicago, Ill. She worked in advertising in Chicago, New York and Paris (Copywriter, Head of women's copy, Senior writer, Copy Group Head at Compton Advertising Co., Dancer-Fitzgerald-Sample, Inc., Sullivan, Stauffer, Colwell & Bayles, Inc. and J. Walter Thompson S.A.).

Her art gallery career began in Paris where she went in 1950, when her husband Paul Deutschman, a writer and journalist, joined the Marshall Plan there. The marriage ended in divorce (1941-1965). During her 15 years in Paris, Mrs. Deutschman worked in advertising, covered French stories for Life (magazine), became friends and sometimes worked with photographers such as Gordon Parks, David Seymour, Inge Morath and Robert Capa as well as Giacometti and the writer James Lord. She also created a women's radio program for the Marshall Plan. Between 1960 and 1965, she was an owner of Galerie du Pont Royale.

In 1966, she returned to New York with her daughter, Deborah Elliott Deutschman (a poet and fiction writer) and became director of the Waddell Gallery from 1966 to 1973. Then she became director of the Alex Rosenberg Gallery, where she gave Gordon Parks his first exhibition in an art gallery. In 1976, she organized and co-curated an exhibition of Giacometti for the Sidney Janis Gallery and stayed working there until the gallery closed in 1999.

She then began working with PaceWildenstein Gallery and curated the exhibition, "The Women of Giacometti" in the fall of 2005. The show traveled to the Nasher Sculpture Center in Dallas in 2006. In 2007, she curated an exhibition of Françoise Gilot’s paintings at the New York Studio School.

Louise Tolliver Deutschman worked as a curator and private art dealer in New York until her death in 2009.
