= Twelve (novel) =

2002 novel by Nick McDonell

- First edition (publ. Grove Press)
- Author: Nick McDonell
- Language: English
- Publisher: Grove Press
- Publication date: 2002

Twelve is a 2002 novel by Nick McDonell about drug addiction, violence and sex among mainly wealthy Manhattan teenagers. The title refers to a new designer drug. The drug is referred to as a cross between cocaine and ecstasy. While Twelve follows the lives of a number of wealthy young adults, it centres on that of 17-year-old drug-dealer White Mike.

== Characters ==
White Mike: Philosophical 17-year-old drug dealer who roams the streets of New York, peddling marijuana to rich teens. His mother died of cancer before the novel begins and his father is almost never around, leaving White Mike to his own devices. White Mike is very intelligent and never uses drugs, including alcohol. Wears an overcoat and jeans. He is the cousin of Charlie with whom he spent much time in their childhood. Shot by Lionel at the end of the book, but survives and goes to Paris to finish his studies.

Hunter McCulloch: Hunter is White Mike's closest friend. He is described as a beefy kid who often plays basketball at the rec center with black kids. At the beginning of the novel, he gets into a fight with a kid named Nana at the rec, and ends up splattered with a large amount of Nana's blood. When Nana is murdered shortly after, he is the prime suspect but is later cleared of all charges.

Chris: A plain 17-year-old young man who desperately wishes to lose his virginity to Sara Ludlow the hottest girl in his school. He is hated by many people but well known for throwing large parties.

Claude: Chris's brother. A psychopath, gun nut, and ex-cocaine abuser who collects bladed weapons, which he buys from a shop in Chinatown. Illegally buys an Uzi and goes on a shooting spree during a party at his house at the climax of the book, killing several of the party-goers. Shot by police shortly after.

Jessica: A plain girl who frequents many parties and becomes addicted to the drug Twelve. Agrees to sleep with Lionel during the climactic house party for more twelve when she cannot pay for it. Fate unknown.

Andrew: Friend of Hunter who is injured at a skating rink. Meets Sara Ludlow at the hospital and is highly attracted to her. Not a party person, but goes to parties to meet girls. Killed by Claude.

Sara Ludlow: The hottest girl in school. Sara is highly promiscuous and uses her feminine traits to get what she wants from Andrew and Chris. Fate unknown, presumably killed by Claude.

Lionel: Murderous drug dealer who sells drugs to Mike and his cousin Charlie. Described as having yellow and brown bloodshot eyes. Kills Charlie and Nana at the beginning of the book. Hunter is blamed for the murders. Agrees to sleep with Jessica in exchange for twelve. Shoots White Mike with Charlie's gun and is killed by Claude as he tries to flee.

Molly: A friend of White Mike's who does not know he is a drug dealer. Very pure, never uses drugs or goes to parties. Killed by Claude.

Timmy and Mark Rothko: Two wanna-be black boys who buy marijuana from White Mike. Speak in exaggerated hip-hop slang. Both killed by Claude.

Charlie: White Mike's cousin who got him into drug dealing. Killed by Lionel.

Nana: Fights Hunter at the gym after a fight that broke out while playing basketball. On the way home, he is shot by Lionel. The blame falls unlawfully on Hunter.

== Plot summary ==
In 1999, 17-year-old White Mike, the privileged son of a restaurant tycoon, is a drug dealer who has taken his senior year in high school off to sell marijuana to his wealthy peers. His mother succumbed to breast cancer years before.

December 27

White Mike visits a rec center. There, Hunter, a white friend of Mike's has gotten into a fight with black basketball player Nana. The fight ends with both covered in each other's blood.

After talking to White Mike, Hunter goes home. There, he makes sporadic conversation with his father, who is quite wealthy and a borderline alcoholic. Hunter then goes for a walk.

Meanwhile, Nana goes to his apartment in the Harlem housing projects. Before he can get into his building, he witnesses a drug deal between a pale white boy and Lionel, a heavy black man. The deal then erupts into violence when Lionel shoots the pale boy with a gun wrapped in a hand towel. Nana tries to escape but is killed as well by Lionel, who pockets the pale boy's revolver before fleeing.

At a party, White Mike sells pot to Chris, the 17-year-old boy throwing the party, but declines Chris's invitation to come in. Chris is desperate to lose his virginity. At the party, Jessica, a school mate of Chris, heads to the bathroom to do cocaine. Instead of cocaine she does "Twelve", a drug given to her by a boy. She takes some, is overwhelmed by the high that follows and passes out.

Meanwhile, Chris's brother Claude and model Tobias take a trip through China Town. They smoke pot together and then buy bladed weapons at a shop. Claude takes home his weapons and arranges them in his closet.

December 28

The corpses of Nana and the pale boy are found. After talking with boys who witnessed the fight at the rec center, detectives place Hunter under arrest because of the blood still on his clothes.

Jessica wakes up and heads to the skating rink with girlfriends. There, she accidentally injures a boy named Andrew by cutting his forehead with her skate. Andrew is taken to the hospital and the girls leave the rink. Jessica calls Chris and asks for White Mike's phone number, telling him that she wants more Twelve.

At the hospital, Andrew undergoes surgery and is placed in a room for an overnight stay. He is placed in the same room as Sean, a high school football star. Sean was involved in a car accident. Sara Ludlow, Sean's girlfriend, arrives to visit him and strikes up a conversation with Andrew. Andrew loans her a CD, thinking that it will make a good excuse to see her again.

Sara then visits Chris and asks him to host another, bigger party on New Year's Eve, since his parents are out of town. Chris is apprehensive, but Sara tempts him with sexual favors, so he gives in.

White Mike meets Jessica with Lionel, who supplies Mike with Marijuana. Lionel sells Twelve to Jessica, who asks for his beeper number in case she wants more; Lionel gives her the number.

White Mike then mentions Charlie, White Mike's cousin who got him into drug dealing and is supposedly away at College. Lionel actually killed Charlie. He tells White Mike that he has not seen Charlie, and departs.

Tobias heads to a shoot at the modelling agency. There, he meets model Molly. Tobias takes Molly to Chris and Claude's. He eventually invites her to the New Year's Eve party and she agrees.

Hunter is placed under arrest for the murders of Nana and Charlie. He finds that he does not have an alibi.

Chris and Claude go to a cocktail party hosted by their aunt. After it, Claude returns to China Town with Tobias and illegally buys an Uzi submachine gun from one of the shops.

December 29

Chris is having a boxing lesson when Sara shows up, requesting money for Twelve, which she will give to Jessica. Chris reluctantly gives her the money.

Molly visits White Mike, who is a good friend of hers. She mentions Tobias and the party. White Mike tries to dissuade her from going.

Andrew goes for a walk, ends up in Carl Schurz park and meets eccentric old man Sven. Sven beats him in a game of chess. Feeling that he is being insulted by Sven, Andrew tries to leave. However, Sven insists on taking him to a nearby pub for a drink. There, Andrew and Sven drink Scotch and Sodas and talk. Feeling weirded out, Andrew leaves. Meanwhile, White Mike is walking home and sees Captain, a homeless bodybuilding black man, injuring himself by hitting a brick wall, and calls an ambulance.

December 30

That morning, Andrew calls Sara under the guise of getting his CD back. She invites him to Chris's party and asks him to bring weed. Andrew does not smoke pot but decides to score some anyway.

Timmy and Mark Rothko, two white, wanna-be "cool kids" who like stealing CDs, smoking weed and speaking in an exaggerated hip-hop vernacular try to buy cigarette usings a fake I.D. It fails and they threaten the store clerk, who pulls an empty revolver on them. They leave quickly. White Mike later sells them weed.

Jessica has lunch with her mother, who advises that she visits a psychiatrist. She reluctantly agrees. Meanwhile, White Mike meets Andrew at the amphitheatre and sells him weed.

New Year's Eve

Andrew wakes up and decides to get a haircut. He does, then at home decides that he looks bad. He decides to go to the party and resolves to get himself drunk.

Chris goes out and buys toiletries and condoms, thinking that tonight will be the night that he loses his virginity. He goes home and throws out his collection of pornography.

Timmy and Mark Rothko call White Mike for more weed. They follow him to his house. He gives them weed and they talk. Timmy and Mark Rothko then go to the supermarket and smash a container of Marshmallow fluff. White Mike receives a call from his dad saying that Charlie is dead. White Mike breaks down and wonders who could have done it.

At the party, Jessica gives her cell phone to a girl who beeps White Mike for weed. White Mike rushes over.

Andrew and Molly meet in the kitchen and decide to head out for pizza when Lionel arrives. Lionel and Jessica go upstairs and she realises that she does not have enough for a bag. She offers to have sex with Lionel in exchange.

Furious, White Mike arrives at the party and trashes the house stereo. He punches Chris when Chris attempts to kick him out.

He bursts in on Lionel and Jessica, who are having sex. Lionel pulls Charlie's revolver, which he took from the murder scene, on White Mike. Realising that Lionel killed Charlie, White Mike attacks him, only to be shot.

The gunshot causes Claude to snap, and he leaves his room armed with his Uzi and sword. He goes on a rampage, killing many partygoers including Timmy, Mark Rothko, Andrew and Molly. After charging through the house, he steps outside and opens fire on the police, who fatally shoot him on the spot.

White Mike undergoes surgery for his wound and survives. Hunter is cleared of all charges after the bullets from Lionel's gun are examined. White Mike later starts studying in Paris.

== Film adaptation ==
The novel was adapted into a 2010 film of the same name directed by Joel Schumacher and starring Chace Crawford, Kiefer Sutherland, Emma Roberts and 50 Cent. Hannover House distributed the film in the United States, opening in 231 theaters on August 6, 2010.
