= Whip It (film) =

2009 film by Drew Barrymore

- Theatrical release poster
- Directed by: Drew Barrymore
- Screenplay by: Shauna Cross
- Based on: Derby Girl by Shauna Cross
- Produced by: Drew Barrymore; Barry Mendel
- Starring: Elliot Page (Note: Credited as Ellen Page); Marcia Gay Harden; Kristen Wiig; Drew Barrymore; Juliette Lewis; Jimmy Fallon; Daniel Stern
- Cinematography: Robert D. Yeoman
- Edited by: Dylan Tichenor
- Music by: The Section Quartet
- Production companies: Dune Entertainment; Mandate Pictures; Vincent Pictures; Flower Films; Rye Road Productions
- Distributed by: Fox Searchlight Pictures (United States); Mandate Pictures (Overseas)
- Release dates: September 13, 2009 (TIFF); October 2, 2009 (United States)
- Running time: 111 minutes
- Country: United States
- Language: English
- Budget: $15 million
- Box office: $16.6 million

Whip It is a 2009 American sports comedy drama film co-produced and directed by Drew Barrymore from a screenplay by Shauna Cross, based on her 2007 novel Derby Girl. It stars Elliot Page as a teenage girl from the fictional town of Bodeen, Texas, who joins a roller derby team. The film also stars Marcia Gay Harden, Kristen Wiig, Barrymore, Juliette Lewis, Jimmy Fallon, and Daniel Stern.

Whip It premiered at the Toronto International Film Festival on September 13, 2009 and was theatrically released in the United States on October 2, by Fox Searchlight Pictures. The film received generally positive reviews from critics, but was a box office disappointment, grossing $16.6 million worldwide against its $15 million budget. Whip It was released on DVD and Blu-ray on January 26, 2010 by 20th Century Fox Home Entertainment.

== Plot ==
Bliss Cavendar is a teenager in the small town of Bodeen, Texas. She has lost interest in the beauty pageants her mother, former beauty queen Brooke, pressures her to win.

While shopping in Austin with her mother, Bliss is intrigued by three roller derby team members she encounters. She and her friend Pash attend a roller derby bout where they see the "Holy Rollers" defeat the "Hurl Scouts". Bliss lies about her age and tries out for the Hurl Scouts, who give her the derby name "Babe Ruthless", and she becomes friendly with teammates "Maggie Mayhem", "Bloody Holly" and "Smashley Simpson". The Hurl Scouts, while enthusiastic and close knit, rarely win, but chant, "We're number two!" after losing a match, to the frustration of their coach, Razor.

"Iron Maven" of the Holy Rollers resents Bliss's talent and youth. Bliss soon realizes she needs to be merciless in roller derby, which also changes other aspects of her life. She stands up to a bully at school and starts dating a lanky musician named Oliver, to whom she loses her virginity before he leaves on a tour, taking a T-shirt Bliss gave him to remember her by, in exchange for his jacket.

The Hurl Scouts continue to lose. Razor convinces them to change their ways after paying their rivals to use one of his plays against them, showing them how much better they could be. The team begins rising in the ranks, soon heading for a championship match against the Holy Rollers.

Bliss's parents discover her involvement in roller derby when Pash is arrested at the arena for underage drinking. Pash is furious with Bliss for leaving her alone, which led to her arrest. When Bliss's parents demand she give up roller derby, she runs away from home and stays with Maggie, discovering she has a young son. Maggie gives Bliss perspective on the difficulties of being a parent.

Bliss sees a picture of Oliver on social media with another girl, who is wearing her t-shirt. Heartbroken, she goes home to her mother, who comforts her. Bliss gives up roller derby and resumes her pageant career so as not to hurt her family or friends any further, and reconciles with Pash.

On the day of the pageant, which is the same day as the roller derby championship, Bliss's father convinces his wife to let Bliss abandon the pageant and go join the Hurl Scouts in their championship game.

Before the game begins, Bliss is approached by Oliver, who denies cheating on her, but she dumps him anyway for never calling her while he was away. The Hurl Scouts narrowly lose the championship match to the Holy Rollers, but they still happily come together and chant, "We're number two!" She and Iron Maven come to a mutual respect. Bliss's mother is still not entirely supportive of roller derby, but accepts that Bliss now knows what makes her happy and is charting her own course in life.

== Cast ==
- Elliot Page as Bliss Cavendar (Babe Ruthless)
- Alia Shawkat as Pash
- Marcia Gay Harden as Brooke Cavendar
- Daniel Stern as Earl Cavendar
- Carlo Alban as Dwayne (Birdman)
- Landon Pigg as Oliver
- Jimmy Fallon as 'Hot Tub' Johnny Rocket
- Kristen Wiig as Maggie Mayhem
- Zoë Bell as Bloody Holly
- Eve as Rosa Sparks
- Drew Barrymore as Smashley Simpson
- Andrew Wilson as Razor
- Juliette Lewis as Iron Maven
- Ari Graynor as Eva Destruction
- Har Mar Superstar as Fight Attendants Coach

== Production ==
=== Production and filming ===
Screenwriter Shauna Cross adapted her 2007 young adult novel Derby Girl for the screen and pitched the script to different production companies while simultaneously pitching its source material to various publishers. Once Barrymore got involved, she and Cross worked for months on script revisions, with Barrymore pushing her to "avoid her story's tidier prospects, to make things 'more raw and open-ended.'" The film project was initially to be handled by Warner Independent Pictures, but Mandate Pictures took over after it was put into a turnaround. Production began summer 2008 in Michigan; principal photography began on July 26, taking place in and around Detroit, Saline, Ypsilanti, Michigan and Birch Run. Real roller derby players were selected from local Michigan teams such as the Detroit Derby Girls, and the Grand Raggidy Roller Girls. Several scenes were also shot in Austin, Texas. Some scenes were also shot in Hamtramck, Michigan at Hamtramck High School as well as Ferndale, Michigan at Ferndale High School. Whip It was produced by Barry Mendel and Drew Barrymore; a co-production between Mandate Pictures and Barrymore's Flower Films. The film was distributed by Fox Searchlight Pictures.

=== Casting ===
On August 12, 2007, it was announced that Elliot Page would play the lead role in the film, while Alia Shawkat, Marcia Gay Harden, Daniel Stern and Carlo Alban were in early talks to join the cast. On August 14, 2007, Landon Pigg, Jimmy Fallon, Kristen Wiig, Zoë Bell, Eve, Drew Barrymore and Andrew Wilson were also in final talks to join the film, Juliette Lewis was added to the cast, playing Iron Maven (a play on Iron Maiden) and on August 18, 2007, Ari Graynor and Har Mar Superstar joined the cast of the film, playing Eva Destruction (a play on Eve of Destruction) and the Fight Attendants Coach. Whip it is the feature-film debut of Pigg.

=== Music ===
The Section Quartet scored the music for the film and on its soundtrack. The soundtrack also contains "Knocked Up" performed by Kings Of Leon, "Pot Kettle Black" performed by Tilly and the Wall, "Sheena Is a Punk Rocker" performed by Ramones, "What's the Altitude" performed by Cut Chemist and Hymnal, "Bang On" performed by The Breeders, "Dead Sound" performed by The Raveonettes, "Blue Turning Grey" performed by Clap Your Hands Say Yeah, "Your Arms Around Me" performed by Jens Lekman, "Learnalilgivinanlovin" performed by Gotye, "Boys Wanna Be Her" performed by Peaches, "Jolene" performed by Dolly Parton, "Caught Up in You" performed by 38 Special, "Never My Love" performed by Har Mar Superstar and Adam Green, "Black Gloves" performed by Goose, "Crown of Age" performed by The Ettes, "High Times" performed by Landon Pigg and Turbo Fruits, "Unattainable" performed by Little Joy, "Doing it Right" performed by The Go! Team, "Breeze" performed by Apollo Sunshine, "Kids" performed by MGMT, "Fun Dream Love Dream" performed by Turbo Fruits, "Know How" performed by Young MC, "The Road to Austin" performed by The Section Quartet, "No Surprises" performed by Radiohead, "Domingo no Parque" performed by Gilberto Gil, "Lollipop" performed by Squeak E. Clean and Desert Eagles and other songs performed by other song performers.

== Release ==
=== Theatrical release ===
Whip It was theatrically released on October 2, 2009 in the United States. Fox Searchlight Pictures distributed the film to 1,721 screens in the United States.

=== Premiere ===
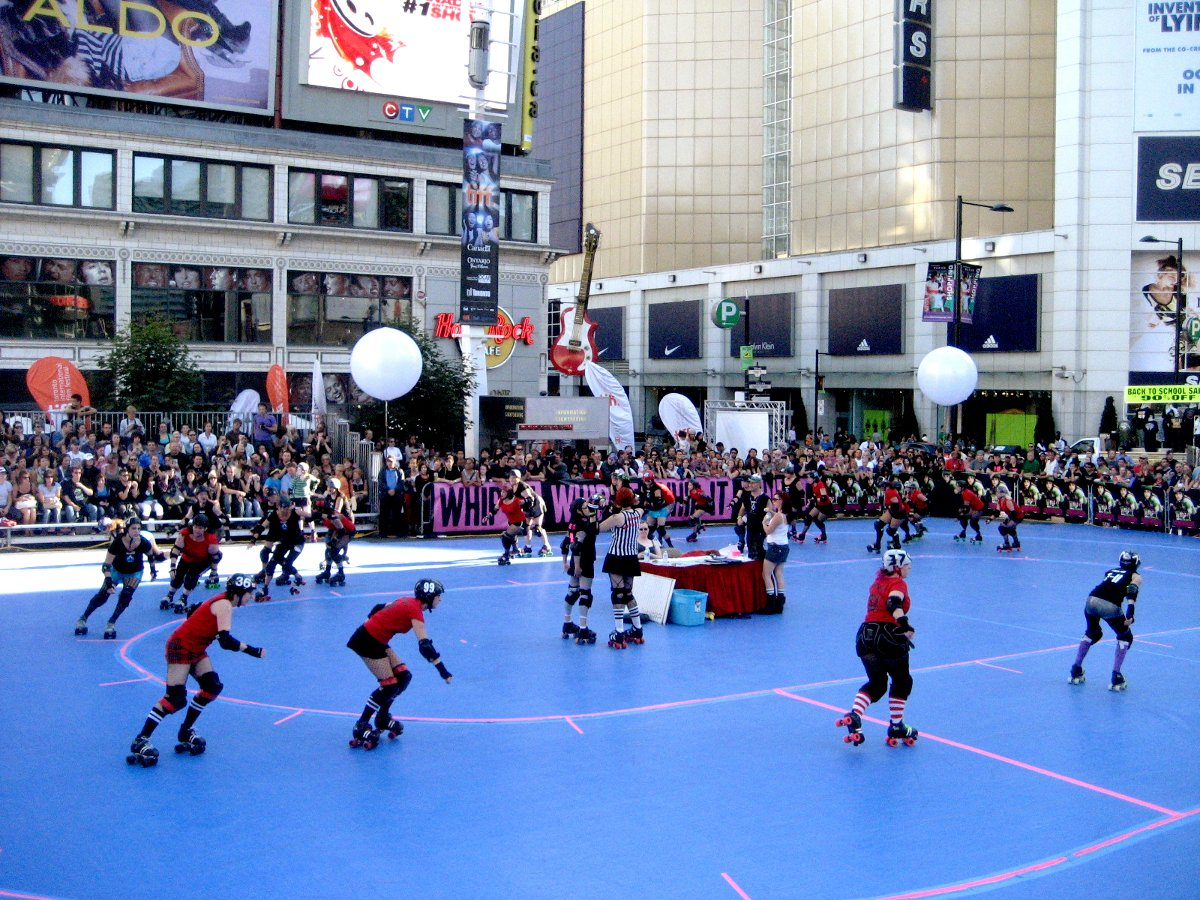
Toronto Roller Derby skaters play an exhibition bout at the Toronto International Film Festival premiere of Whip It, September 13, 2009

The world premiere of the film was held at the 2009 Toronto International Film Festival in Toronto, Ontario, Canada. The majority of the film's main cast attended the premiere. As part of the festivities, members of local league Toronto Roller Derby held an exhibition bout at Yonge-Dundas Square (now Sankofa Square) in downtown Toronto. Toronto Roller Derby skaters, like those in other cities with major roller derby leagues, also helped promote the film in advance of the screening by wearing costumes from the film and skating around town and performing stunts while handing out flyers and giveaway items. Toronto Roller Derby credits their luck in being able to skate at the festival for helping expand their fanbase as well as their skater rosters.

=== Home media ===
Whip It was released on DVD and Blu-ray on January 26, 2010 by 20th Century Fox Home Entertainment.

== Reception ==
=== Critical response ===
Critical reception for Whip It was generally positive. As of April 2025, the film holds an 86% approval rating on Rotten Tomatoes, based on 190 reviews with an average score of 7/10. The website's critics consensus reads: "While made from overly familiar ingredients, Drew Barrymore's directorial debut has enough charm, energy, and good-natured humor to transcend its many clichés". Metacritic calculated an average score of 68, based on 32 reviews, indicating "generally favorable reviews".

A. O. Scott called the film "predictable", but said "You might, nonetheless, want to see this movie, even—or maybe especially—if you have seen Billy Elliot or Bend It Like Beckham. Familiarity is not always a bad thing, and if the script, by Shauna Cross, piles sports movie and coming-of-age touchstones into a veritable cairn of clichés, the cast shows enough agility and conviction to make them seem almost fresh." Roger Ebert said it's a "coming-together of two free spirits, Drew Barrymore and [Elliot] Page, and while it may not reflect the kind of female empowerment Gloria Steinem had in mind, it has guts, charm, and a black-and-blue sweetness." According to the Miami Herald, "Whip It is completely predictable from the first frame. It also is ridiculously, utterly entertaining. Drew Barrymore's smashing directorial debut harkens back to an era in which Hollywood studio pictures could still move and enthrall the audience while plying in hoary cliches."

Writing in Glamour, Tracey Lomrantz Lester noted the narrative significance of the protagonist's vintage Stryper t-shirt, describing it as a "prized possession" whose fate becomes central to the film's romantic subplot. A reviewer for CBN noted that Bliss fondly describes Stryper to her boyfriend as "an '80s Christian Heavy Metal band" who "in the name of Jesus... rock!", and that the shirt "becomes a key part of the story."

=== Box office ===
Whip It was financially unsuccessful. Initial studio estimates showed Whip It in a tie for #6 in its opening weekend, tying with the widely released Capitalism: A Love Story, and it wound up taking sixth place with $4,650,812. The film grossed $13,043,363 in North America. It grossed $3,589,672 in foreign movie sales, for a grand total of $16,633,035 worldwide. Production cost of the film was $15 million.

=== Accolades ===
| Year | Award | Category | Nominee | Result |
|---|---|---|---|---|
| 2009 | Alliance of Women Film Journalists | Perseverance Award | Drew Barrymore | Nominated |
| 2009 | Stockholm Film Festival | Bronze Horse Award | Drew Barrymore | Nominated |
| 2009 | Women Film Critics Circle Awards | Best Comedic Actress | Elliot Page | Nominated |
| 2009 | Women's Image Network Awards | Outstanding Actress Feature Film | Elliot Page | Nominated |
| 2009 | Women's Image Network Awards | Outstanding Actress Feature Film | Drew Barrymore | Nominated |
| 2010 | Dorian Awards | Campy Film of the Year | Whip It! | Nominated |

== Soundtrack ==
The film has a 58-song playlist, with a wide range of styles and genres. Nineteen tracks appear on the CD of the soundtrack, with additional tracks at various MP3 stores.
