= Howard Eisenberg =

American author and journalist (born 1926)

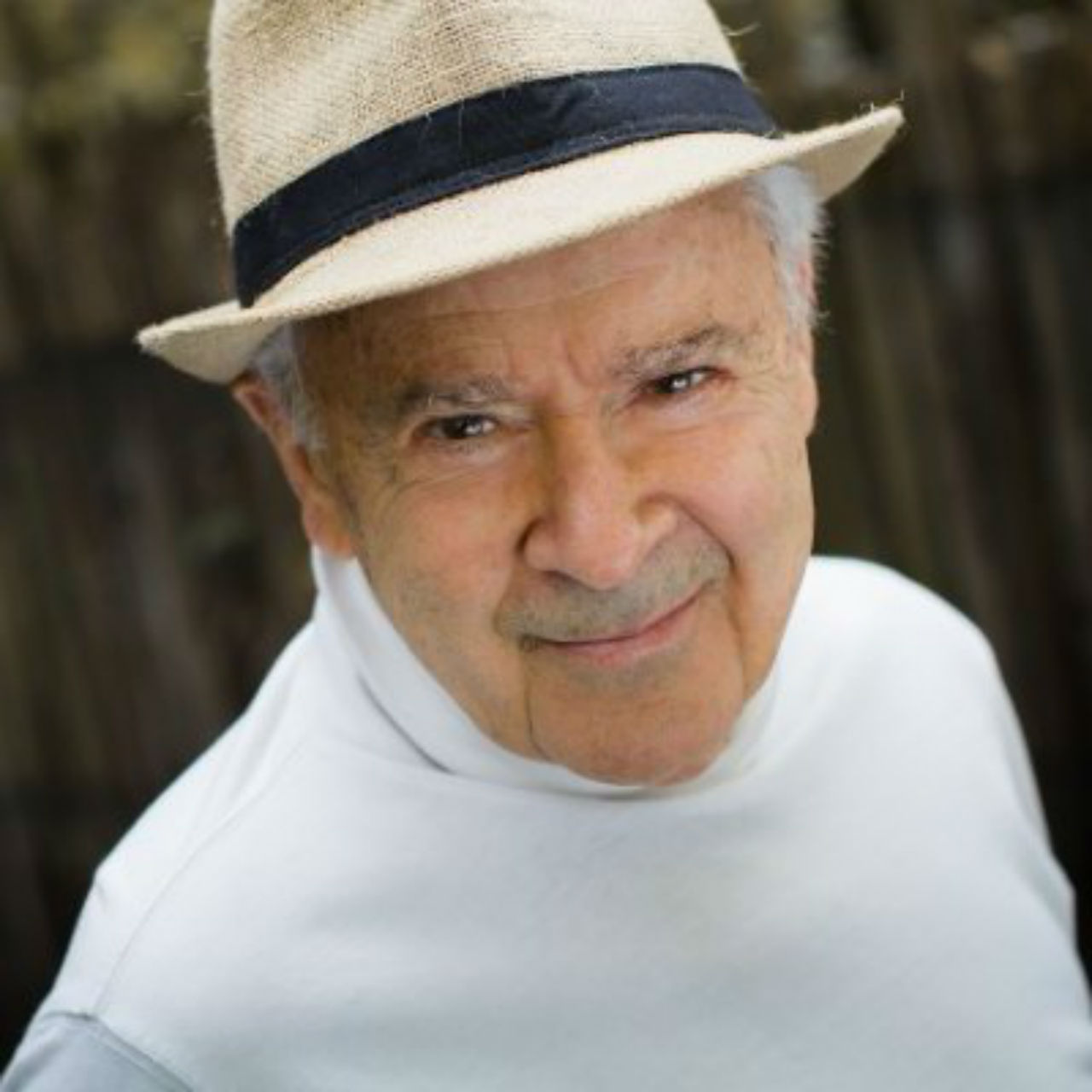
- Howard Eisenberg
- Born: Howard Eisenberg; August 26, 1926 (age 100); New York City, U.S.
- Education: University of Miami
- Occupations: Author, playwright, journalist
- Years active: 1944–present
- Spouse: Arlene Eisenberg
- Children: Sandee Eisenberg; Evan Eisenberg; Heidi Murkoff
- Awards: National Council of Christians and Jews: Gold Medal for the Look Magazine Cover Story: "The Christian War on Anti-Semitism"; American Society of Journalists and Authors: Best Book of 2015 in the Service and Self-Help Category
- Website: Howard Eisenberg

Howard Eisenberg (born 26 August 1926) is an American author and journalist best known for his contributions to biography, self-help and children's literature. A magazine journalist since the early 1950s and recent playwright, as well as a member of the American Society of Journalists and Authors (ASJA).

Eisenberg has written many articles—often with his late wife, Arlene Eisenberg— for national publications. Additionally he's written six adult books, four co-authored with his wife Arlene, three Guess Who books for children, and scripts for radio and TV.

Eisenberg's wife, Arlene Eisenberg co-authored the original What To Expect When You're Expecting, a pregnancy guide for expecting parents, with Heidi Murkoff. The Arlene Awards were created by Howard Eisenberg for the American Society of Journalists and Authors, to honor his late wife Arlene Eisenberg. The fund provides awards for bestselling books and magazine articles that make a documented difference.

== Awards ==
In 1965, the Eisenbergs won the Gold Medal by the National Council of Christian and Jews, for the Look Magazine cover story: "The Christian War on Anti-Semitism"

In 2015, Eisenberg won the Outstanding Book of 2015 Award in the Service and Self-Help category by the American Society of Journalists and Authors for The Recovery Book.

== Bibliography ==
=== Children's books ===
- Adorable Scoundrels (Mascot) 2016

==== Series ====
- Guess Who Zoo (Mascot) 2013
- Guess Who Farm (Mascot) 2013
- Guess Who Neighborhood (Mascot) 2013

=== Adult books ===
- It's Never Too Late to Date (iUniverse) -- 2009
- The Recovery Book (Workman) -- 1992, 2014
- A Funny Thing Happened on the Way to Cooperstown (Triumph) -- 2003
- Night Calls: The Personal Journey of an Ob/Gyn (Arbor House) -- 1986
- Alive and Well: Decisions in Health (McGraw-Hill) -- 1979
- How to be Your Own Lawyer (Sometimes) (Putnam) -- 1979
- How to be Your Own Doctor (Sometimes) (Grosset & Dunlap) -- 1975

=== Musicals ===
- The Guess Who Zoo 1995
- The Million Dollar Bet 2015
- Adorable Scoundrels 2016, a mini-musical

=== Magazines ===
- Saturday Evening Post
- New York Times Magazine
- Sports Illustrated
- Reader's Digest
- Cosmopolitan
- Parade
- Ladies Home Journal
- Good Housekeeping
- McCall's
- Many others
