= Terry McDonell =

American magazine editor (born 1944)

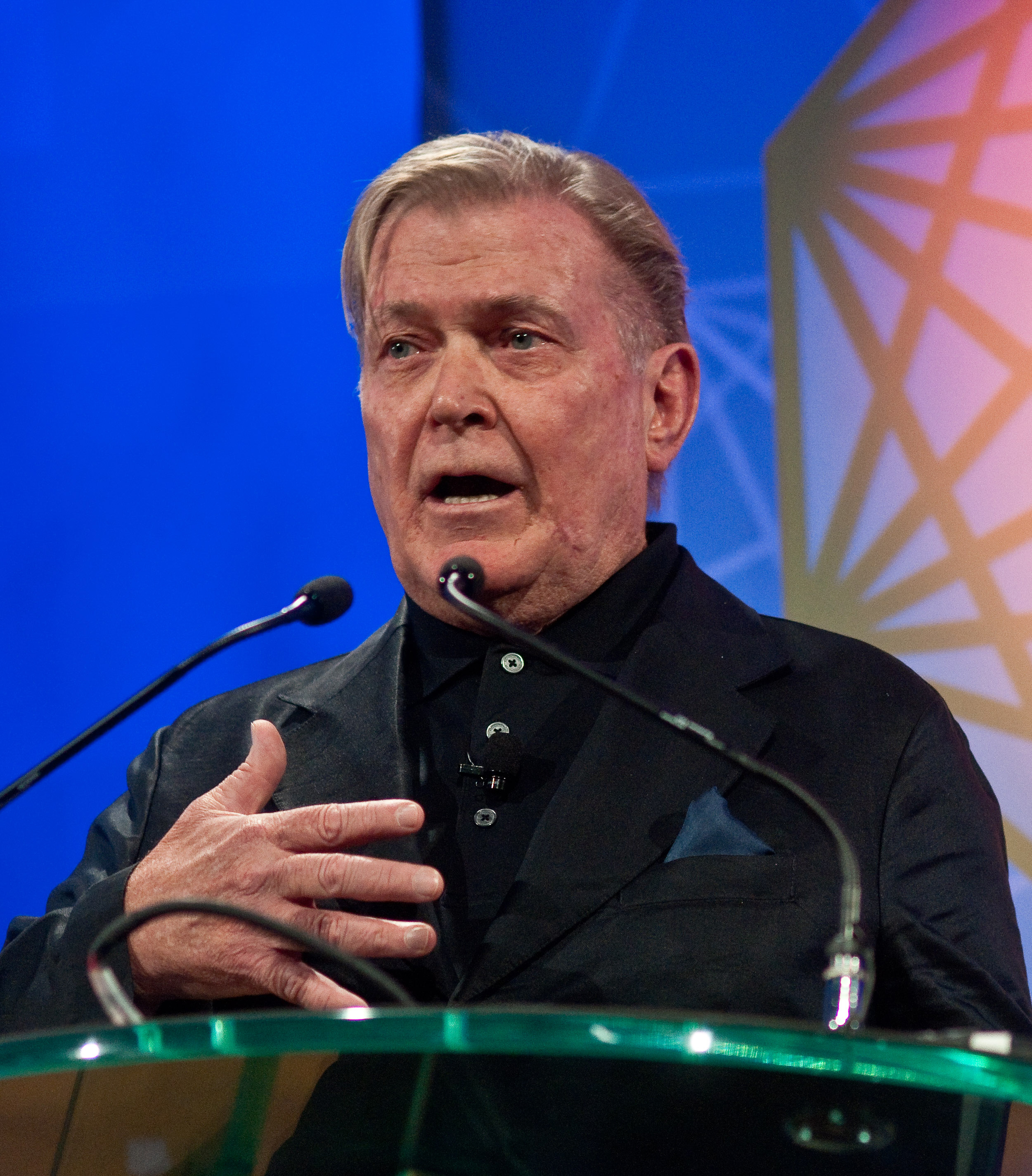
- McDonell at Fortune Brainstorm TECH, July 2011
- Born: August 1, 1944 (age 82); Norfolk, Virginia, United States
- Occupation: Magazine editor
- Children: Nick McDonell; Thomas McDonell
- Parents: Robert Meynard McDonell (father); Irma Sophronia Nelson (mother)

Robert Terry McDonell (born August 1, 1944) is an American editor, writer and publishing executive. He is a co-founder of the Literary Hub website that launched in 2015. His memoir, The Accidental Life: An Editor's Notes on Writing and Writers, was published by Knopf in 2016, and he is also the author of Irma: The education of a Mother's Son (2023).

== Early life and education ==
McDonell was born in Norfolk, Virginia, the son of Irma Sophronia (née Nelson) and Robert Meynard McDonell.

McDonell attended the University of California, Berkeley, and graduated from the University of California, Irvine.

== Magazine career ==
McDonell served as editor of Time Inc. Sports Group from 2006 to 2012.

As Editor of the Time Inc. Sports Group, McDonell directed all editorial content and operations of the weekly magazine Sports Illustrated, SI.com, GOLF Magazine and GOLF.com, as well as SI Kids, FanNation.com, and international editions including SI China, SI South Africa, and SI India.

He was hired as SI's 8th Managing Editor of Sports Illustrated in February 2002. Under his leadership, SI Digital's net revenues jumped 180% in 2006 and 587% over three years. That digital growth along with newsstand sales and reader satisfaction scores for the weekly were among the reasons McDonell was named one of Sports Business Journal’s 50 Most Influential People in Sports Business in 2007 and a member of Adweek’s Magazine Executive Team of the Year.

In 2009, McDonell created the first magazine for the iPad.

Before moving to SI, McDonell led the conversion of Wenner Media's US Magazine to US Weekly. He came to Wenner Media to edit Men's Journal, and had also worked at Wenner, launching Outside Magazine in 1977, and editing Rolling Stone in the early 1980s. He left Rolling Stone for Newsweek (1983–85), where he was an AME and also created Newsweek Access ("The Magazine of Life and Technology").

McDonell was the founding editor of both Rocky Mountain Magazine (1979) and SMART (1984-90) magazines.

As the editor-in-chief of Esquire magazine from 1990 to 1993, McDonell also launched Esquire Sportsman and Esquire Gentleman. After Esquire, he was editor-in-chief and publisher of Sports Afield, which he relaunched as an upscale hunting and fishing magazine.

McDonell's magazines have been nominated for 29 National Magazine Awards and received the award in 2003, 2005 and 2010.

In 2012, McDonell was inducted into the ASME Magazine Editors' Hall of Fame.

== Writing ==
McDonell is also a novelist (California Bloodstock) and a poet (Wyoming: The Lost Poems). His memoir, The Accidental Life: An Editor's Notes on Writing and Writers was published by Knopf in 2016. A second memoir, Irma: The Education of a Mother's Son, was published by HarperCollins in 2023. He also wrote the video game Night Trap.

== Television ==
As a television writer he wrote for Miami Vice (episodes "Back in the World" and "Over the Line"); and China Beach (episode "Waiting for Beckett").

McDonell appeared as himself on Saturday Night Live ("Prose and Cons") in 1981 and co-hosted the television talk show Last Call produced by Brandon Tartikoff and MCA (1994-95).

== Service and awards ==
McDonell serves as president of the board of directors of The Paris Review Foundation.

Since 2016 McDonell's papers have been collected at The Briscoe Center for American History at the University of Texas.

== Personal life ==
McDonell lives in Manhattan with his wife, Stacey Hadash. With his first wife, Joan Raffeld, he is the father of novelist Nick McDonell and actor Thomas McDonell.
