= Derby Girl =

2007 novel by Shauna Cross

- Author: Shauna Cross
- Language: English
- Genre: Young adult novel
- Publisher: Henry Holt and Co.
- Publication date: September 4, 2007
- Publication place: United States
- Media type: Print Hardcover
- Pages: 240pp
- ISBN: 0-8050-8023-6

Derby Girl is a 2007 novel by Shauna Cross. It tells the story of Bliss Cavendar, a girl from the fictional town of Bodeen, Texas, whose mother wants her to compete in beauty pageants, and seeks escape in the world of roller derby. The book was named an American Library Association Best Book for Young Adults and a New York Public Library Book for the Teen Age.

The novel was made into the movie Whip It directed by Drew Barrymore.
