= Heidi Murkoff =

American author

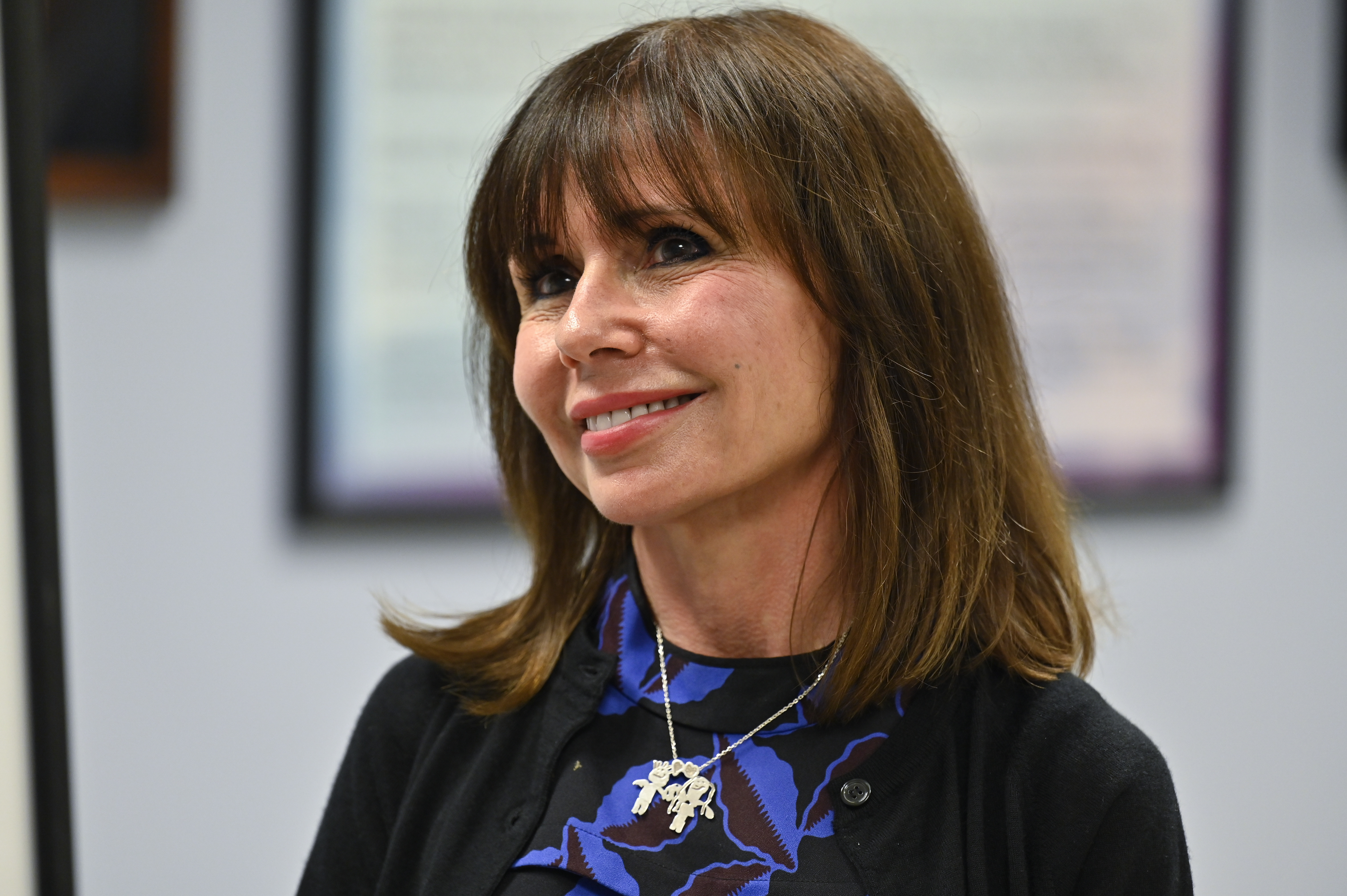
- Murkoff in 2022
- Born: Heidi Eisenberg; November 28, 1958 (age 67)
- Occupation: Author
- Notable work: What to Expect When You're Expecting
- Parent(s): Howard Eisenberg; Arlene Eisenberg

Heidi Murkoff (born November 28, 1958) is the co-author of the What to Expect When You're Expecting series of pregnancy guides. She is also the creator of WhatToExpect.com and founder of the What to Expect Project.

== What to Expect series ==
Murkoff conceived the idea for What to Expect When You're Expecting during her first pregnancy, when she could not find answers to her questions in books she consulted. Hours before having her daughter Emma, Heidi delivered the proposal for a pregnancy guide.

What to Expect When You're Expecting has printed more than 22 million copies as of June 2023. Currently in the 20th printing of its 5th edition, it became the longest-running title of all time on The New York Times Best Seller list in June 2015, a record it still holds. USA Today named it one of the most influential books in a quarter century — also reporting that it is read by 93 percent of women who read a pregnancy book.

Other titles in the series include What to Expect the First Year, Eating Well When You're Expecting, What to Expect Before You're Expecting, What to Expect the Second Year, What to Expect When Mommy's Having a Baby and What to Expect When the New Baby Comes Home. The What to Expect books have sold more than 42 million copies worldwide and are published in 38 countries and in 44 languages.

In 2012, the original book became a romantic comedy film with the same name and Murkoff served as executive producer. The film is a comedy about five couples expecting children.

== WhatToExpect.com ==
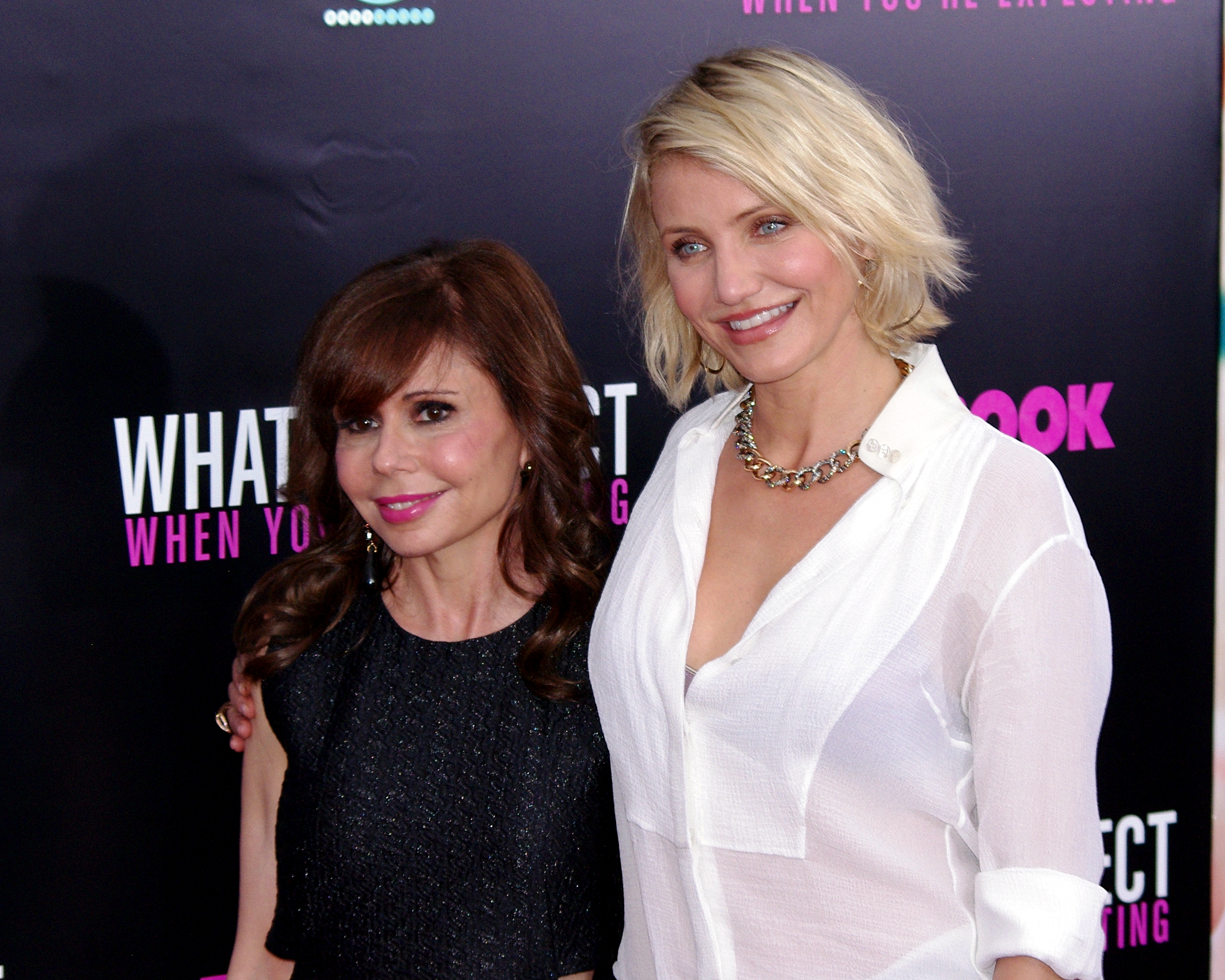
Murkoff with Cameron Diaz at the 2012 premiere of What to Expect When You're Expecting.

In 2005, Murkoff expanded the What to Expect (WTE) brand online with WhatToExpect.com, which registers over 60% of United States pregnancies and is the #1 rated pregnancy app on the App Store. WhatToExpect.com has 20 million users, with an average of 800,000 new posts each month, a new post every two seconds, and the average user visiting 14 times a month. The app offers weekly content and videos by Murkoff, and she also answers questions daily on Facebook, Instagram and Twitter.

== What to Expect Project ==
The What to Expect Project is a nonprofit organization dedicated to helping mothers in need have healthy pregnancies, safe deliveries and healthy babies. Its program Baby Basics includes a culturally appropriate, research-based low-literacy pregnancy guide, supportive curriculum and training for health care professionals and staff in clinics, and is available in English, Spanish and Chinese; it has been distributed to over 900,000 expectant at-risk mothers and babies. The Project also partnered with the United States Department of State to bring the Basics book and program to Liberia and Bangladesh and plans to expand the program to Nigeria.

In 2013, Murkoff, her husband Erik and the What to Expect Project partnered with the United Service Organizations to create Special Delivery, a program that supports expectant mothers in the military. Murkoff has hosted more than 200 Special Delivery baby showers for more than 25,000 military mothers, both in active duty and as spouses, around the world. The showers were held virtually during the early period of the COVID-19 pandemic, but are now being held in-person again.

Special Delivery Dad's Edition showers — also hosted by Murkoff — celebrate military expectant fathers at bases around the world. Murkoff advocates for military mothers, maternal health in the military and the wellbeing of military families, and has brought several pieces of legislation to the National Defense Authorization Act for Fiscal Year 2021 which were enacted into law, including the Doulas Under Tricare Bill. On June 23, 2022, the Murkoffs received the Elizabeth and Zachary Fisher Distinguished Civilian Humanitarian Award for their support of military families. They were nominated by the United States Navy and were presented with the award on behalf of the United States Department of Defense by the United States Secretary of the Air Force, Frank Kendall III, at a ceremony at The Pentagon's Hall of Heroes.

The What to Expect Project has expanded its mission globally, including to South Sudan, Sierra Leone, Somalia, Syria, Bangladesh, and India, working with International Medical Corps and Jhpiego to help deliver maternal healthcare and training.

== Bump Day ==
In 2015, The What to Expect Project debuted the social media advocacy campaign #BumpDay with founding partners International Medical Corps, 1,000 Days and the United Nation Universal Access Project. This campaign celebrates baby bumps and healthy pregnancies around the world, while raising awareness about the need for more equitable maternal health care both in the U.S. and globally. Since 2020, #BumpDay has focused efforts on reversing escalating rates of maternal mortality and widening gaps in care for Black mothers, AIAN mothers, and rural mothers living in maternity care deserts in the U.S. Bump Day invites mothers and others to post photos of their baby bumps (past or present) on Instagram and Twitter while sharing messages of support for each other. The campaign has been shared by influential figures including Olivia Wilde, Christy Turlington, Brooklyn Decker, Pharrell Williams, Chris Coons, Kirsten Gillibrand, Richard Blumenthal, and Tammy Murphy, as well as hundreds of global health and community health organizations, advocacy groups, and government agencies.

== Activism ==
Murkoff is an activist for maternal health, meeting and making media appearances with leaders in the United States Senate and House of Representatives to discuss issues that impact mothers and families, including maternal healthcare, mental healthcare, family leave, and family planning. She works with the Centers for Disease Control and Prevention, Department of Health and Human Services, Substance Abuse and Mental Health Services Administration, and public health agencies and organizations. She has done multiple interviews for the What to Expect platform with public health experts, including Rochelle Walensky, Anthony Fauci, and Vivek Murthy. Murkoff also sits on the board of the 2030 Collaborative.

== Media ==
Murkoff has appeared on Today, Good Morning America, The Early Show, The Oprah Winfrey Show, BBC Breakfast, Good Morning Australia, and CBS News Sunday Morning. She is a frequent guest on radio and podcasts, and hosted the What to Expect Podcast with her daughter Emma.

== Awards ==
In 2011, Heidi was named one of the Time 100 most influential people. She has also been honored by Smithsonian Associates with the John P. McGovern Award, which recognizes contributions to American families, and has been inducted into the Books for a Better Life Hall of Fame. In 2015, she received the International Medical Corps Humanitarian Award, and in 2021, she and her husband were honored with the Jhpiego Visionary Award.

== Personal life ==
Murkoff and her husband Erik reside in Southern California. Together, they have two children and two grandchildren.
