= What to Expect When You're Expecting =

Book by Heidi Murkoff

- Author: Heidi Murkoff
- Language: English
- Subject: pregnancy
- Publisher: Workman Publishing Company
- Publication date: 1984
- Publication place: United States
- Media type: Paperback
- Pages: 351 (1st ed.); 480 (2nd ed.); 597 (3rd ed.); 616 (4th ed.); 656 (5th ed.)
- ISBN: 0-89480-769-2
- OCLC: 11196060
- Dewey Decimal: 618.2/4 19
- LC Class: RG525 .E36 1984
- Website: www.whattoexpect.com

What to Expect When You're Expecting is a pregnancy guide, now in its fifth edition, written by Heidi Murkoff and Sharon Mazel and published by Workman Publishing. Its first, second, and third editions, authored by Murkoff, Arlene Eisenberg, and Sandee Hathaway, was originally published in 1984. Its fourth and fifth editions, authored by Murkoff and Mazel, were published in 2008 and 2016. The book consistently tops The New York Times Best Seller list in the paperback advice category, is one of USA Today's "25 Most Influential Books" of the past 25 years and has been described as "the bible of American pregnancy". As of 2021, per the publisher and the author's agent, over 22 million copies have been printed. According to USA Today, 93 percent of all expectant mothers who read a pregnancy guide read What to Expect When You're Expecting. In 2005, WhatToExpect.com launched. The What to Expect mobile app launched on iOS in 2009 and Android in 2014. In 2012, What to Expect When You're Expecting was adapted into a film released by Lionsgate.

== History ==
Author Heidi Murkoff cites her own quest for reassuring information during her first pregnancy as being the motivation for developing What to Expect When You're Expecting. Murkoff collaborated with her mother Arlene Eisenberg, a freelance journalist, and her sister Sandee Hathway, a nurse, when writing the first three editions of the pregnancy guide. Murkoff collaborated with Sharon Mazel, a journalist, when writing the fourth and fifth editions of the pregnancy guide.

Its title emerged when an employee of the publisher suggested it as a subtitle for the temporarily titled manuscript, "Pregnancy:" By publication, the subtitle had claimed the top spot.

== What to Expect When You're Expecting ==
The book presents advice in a question-and-answer format. The content is arranged in chronological order, from the earliest stages of pregnancy into the postpartum period. The beginning of each chapter includes a section called “Your Body This Month,” which lists common physical and emotional changes and symptoms a woman may be experiencing, and gives information on what a woman can expect when visiting her doctor or nurse midwife during checkups. Also included in each chapter is a section entitled "Your Baby This Month" which displays pictures of the growing embryo or fetus. An additional section titled "What You May Be Concerned About" is designed to address a wide range of concerns, problems and life trends. There are also “For Dads” boxes integrated throughout the book.

The book's appendix lists additional sources of information and resources.

== Controversy ==
What to Expect When You're Expecting has been criticized for promoting paranoia and fear among pregnant women for focusing on complications and for its extremely strict dietary guidelines. Murkoff also has no medical training and has been further criticized for stating she asks obstetricians to comment on manuscripts only late in the writing and editing processes. With the first publishing of the book being in 1984, one reason it is considered problematic is due to the many old and unrevised printings in public circulation. Although wording is revised with every single printing of the book with major rewrites indicated by new editions to respond to critiques, older copies are passed down by women to their pregnant peers.

The Science Based Medicine blog criticized the book for its recommendations of Complementary and Alternative Medicines (CAM), such as Acupuncture, Reflexology, Aromatherapy and Homeopathy. The blog post concludes: “There is no credible scientific evidence to support any of these recommendations. It could be argued that this is all feel-good, ‘keep-the-patient entertained’ advice with little chance of direct harm. But it is deceptive and dishonest to represent these modalities as effective treatments based on science, especially in a book that is otherwise scientifically reliable.”

== Other titles ==
The authors went on to develop a What to Expect series:

- What to Eat When You're Expecting (1986)
- What to Expect: The First Year (1989)
- What to Expect: The Toddler Years (1994)
- What to Expect at Bedtime (2000)
- What to Expect When the New Baby Comes Home (2001)
- What to Expect: Pregnancy Planner (2002)
- What to Expect: Babysitter's Handbook (2003)
- What to Expect at Preschool (2003)
- What to Expect When Mommy's Having a Baby (2004)
- What to Expect: Eating Well When You're Expecting (2005; follow-up to What to Eat When You're Expecting)
- What to Expect: Pregnancy Journal & Organizer (2007)
- What to Expect Before You're Expecting (2009)
- What to Expect: the Second Year (2011)

== Digital properties ==
WhatToExpect.com debuted in April 2005. The What to Expect mobile app launched on iOS in 2009 and Android in 2014. The digital properties provide information about preconception, pregnancy, the postpartum period, and child and infant health. The app provides users with personalized resources, tools, and information based on their due date or child’s birthday, including 3D renderings, common symptoms, and weekly videos. As of November 2024, the app had over 5 million downloads on the Google Play Store and more than 340,000 reviews on the Apple App Store.

In 2022, the What to Expect mobile app was given a "*Privacy not included" rating by the non-profit Mozilla Foundation. In 2024, 404 Media reported that security researcher Ovi Liber had found serious vulnerabilities in the What to Expect mobile app, including the exposure of the email addresses of group administrators in the community forum as well as an API endpoint that allowed for user passwords to be brute forced, neither of which the company responded to when alerted by Liber.

== What to Expect Project ==
In 1997, author, and former publishing executive, Lisa Bernstein, founded the What to Expect Foundation whose stated mission is to help low-income families expect healthy pregnancies, safe deliveries, and happy babies. The Foundation changed its name to What to Expect Project, which is a 501(c)3 public operating charity. The organization’s stated mission is “educate and empower moms in need so they can expect healthier pregnancies, safer deliveries, healthier babies, and healthier futures.”

== Film adaptation ==
Even though the book does not contain a storyline, Lionsgate adapted What to Expect When You're Expecting into a film of the same name directed by Kirk Jones. It features an ensemble cast starring Jennifer Lopez, Cameron Diaz, Elizabeth Banks, Anna Kendrick, Chris Rock, Brooklyn Decker, Rodrigo Santoro, Rob Huebel, Chace Crawford and Matthew Morrison. The film was released on May 18, 2012.
