= SOCAP =

SOCAP may refer to:

- SOCAP International or Society of Consumer Affairs Professionals in Business, a trade organization
- Serious Organised Crime and Police Act 2005, a law in the United Kingdom
- SOCAP (conference) annual conference on impact investing and social impact.
