= Jonathan Cristol =

- Education: Bard College; Yale University; University of Bristol
- Scientific career
- Fields: International Relations
- Workplaces: Bard College; Yale University; University of Bristol; Adelphi University; Yeshiva University
- Website: https://www.jonathancristol.com

Jonathan Cristol is an American academic, professor, and U.S. foreign policy commentator. He is a frequent contributor to CNN and is the author of The United States and the Taliban before and after 9/11 published in 2018. Cristol is affiliated with the Center for Civic Engagement at Bard College, the Levermore Global Scholars Program at Adelphi University, and the Carnegie Council for Ethics in International Affairs.

Cristol is an expert on issues pertaining to international security, Middle East politics, the Korean Peninsula, and U.S. foreign policy in the Middle East and East Asia. He is also a scholar of political realism and has specific expertise in the works of Hans Morgenthau. Regarding Cristol's recent analysis of the Taliban, the academic press Palgrave Macmillan has asserted that his 2018 book "present[s] a different picture of the Taliban from what most people have in mind."

== Early life ==
He earned his Ph.D. in International Relations at the University of Bristol in the United Kingdom and his M.A. in International Relations at Yale University, after receiving his B.A. from Bard College. He credits the late American foreign policy historian James Chace with inspiring his deep interest in diplomatic history and international relations theory.
