= Tess Brady =

Australian writer

- Dr. Tess Brady giving a talk at 2012 Paju Book City
- Born: 1948 (age 77–78); Adelaide, South Australia
- Occupations: Writer, interviewer, presenter

Tess Brady (born 1948) is a writer, interviewer and presenter. She was the inaugural artistic director for Clunes Booktown Festival.

== Biography ==
Brady was born in Adelaide, South Australia. She studied at the University of Adelaide, Flinders University, Exeter University, and Deakin University. She has an honours degree in Philosophy, a Masters in Educational Linguistics and a Doctorate in Writing. She has taught Writing at the University of South Australia, Griffith University and Deakin University. With Associate Professor Nigel Krauth she was founding editor of TEXT which she co-edited for 9 years.

Brady has been published in a number of genres including Children's Picture Books, Adult Radio Drama, Self Help Books and Crime Fiction. She is the presenter and interviewer for the What I Wrote series of DVDs on Australian playwrights.

Brady has one daughter, the documentary filmmaker Catherine Gough-Brady. Brady lives in Clunes, rural Victoria.

== Published works ==
- Tess Brady The Noise of Empty Buildings Attitude Publishing, Clunes, 2021
- Nigel Krauth & Tess Brady, eds Creative Writing: Theory beyond practice. Post Pressed, Brisbane, 2006
- Tess Brady & Donna Lee Brien. The Girl's Guide to Real Estate: How to enjoy investing in property, Allen & Unwin, Sydney, 2002
- Donna Lee Brien & Tess Brady The Girls Guide to Work and Life: How to create the life you want, Allen and Unwin, Sydney, 2004
- Tess Brady Paint Me A Murder, Hudson Hawthorn, Melbourne, 1989
- Tess Brady & Rob Hylton The Flying Machine, Nelson, Melbourne, 1981
- Tess Brady & Kay Stewart Nobody's Granny, Ashton Scholastic, Sydney, 1989
- Tess Brady & Rachel Tonkin Trouble With Rainbows, Lothian, Melbourne, 1990
- Tess Brady & Jenny Boult (eds)After the Rage: South Australian Women's Art and Writing, Tutu Press, Adelaide, 1983

== Television ==
Brady is the presenter of the What I Wrote series. In this series Tess Brady provides a critical commentary on plays by Australian playwrights, as well as interviewing them about their work. The first series broadcast on ABC TV 1 in February 2010. There have been two further series.

Brady is the script editor of A Journey Through Asian Art. Legal Briefs and Ethics Matters

== Radio dramas ==
- Anthony, a Play for Three Women ABC 1982, 1983 ABC Studios, Sydney. Production: Andrew McLennan; Sound Recordist: Neal Smith; Actors: Lady One - Robyn Nevin; Lady Two - Judy Davis; Wife - Joan Bruce
- United We Stand ABC 1982, 1983. ABC Studios, Sydney Production Andrew McLennan, Sound Recordist Neal Smith, Actors: Sister - Kerry McGuire; Brother - John Fitzgerald; Father - Martin Vaughan; Mother - Margaret Christensen Younger Sister - Selena McLennan; Child Max Sellin; Priest - Peter Gwynne
- Thirty Trivial Items ABC 1983, 1991 ABC Studios, Sydney, Production: Andrew McLennan; Sound Recordist: Neal Smith; Actor: Tim Robertson
- The Interview 5MMM 1981 SAW Studio, Adelaide, Sound Engineering Geoff Lloyd and Bo Jones; Actors; Sue - Jude Watters; Beni - John Currey
- Six Minutes ABC 1981, 5UV 1984 ABC Studios Adelaide; Production: Herbert Davies; Technical Operator: Brad Williams; Production Assistant: Anna Shone; Actors: Woman - Katheryne Fisher; Man - Lawrence Hayes
- People in a Gallery 5MMM, 1983 5MMM Studios, Adelaide. Production: Chris Trimmer and Tess Brady; Sound Recordist: Chris Trimmer
- Woman in a Built Up Area ABC 1986,1989 ABC Studios Melbourne. Production: Anne McInerney
