= Proof of Age =

Legal process in feudal England

A Proof of Age was a mechanism during the Middle Ages in England by which heirs proved themself of legal age for inheritance purposes.

== History ==
In medieval law, males reached legal adulthood when they were 21, and females at 14; the discrepancy lies in the fact that girls were more likely to marry when wards. This was a period where mandatory certification of birth was not a legal requirement, (Note: Due to the paucity of parish record-keeping, juries continued to be used to establish age when necessary until the 19th century. Mandatory registration would not become statutory until the Births and Deaths Registration Act 1836.) yet knowing when heirs to feudal estates were born was of great importance, as it could impact financially. If a person's father died before they were old enough to inherit, then they could be taken into wardship by the king and his estates into royal escheat. As such, proving one's age accurately was, according to Sue Sheridan Walker, "of the utmost legal, social and economic significance" in the efficient working of land law. Because there was no requirement to record births in writing, it was necessary to rely on living memory.

The earliest surviving Proofs of Age date from 1272, either at the very end of Henry III's reign or the beginning of Edward I's. In the early days, there was no fixed oversight for the hearing, and while the escheator and his staff was holding them from the start, so also was the Court of King's Bench, the curia regis and the peripatetic eyre courts. Likewise, witnesses' evidence was often not recorded, which means that for these we know that they remembered a birth or baptism, but not necessarily why. The mechanism as it was to remain appears to have been codified by the late 14th century. Proofs of Age inquiries, when being held into major landowners and scions of the nobility could involve at its greatest extent hundreds of officials, thousands of jurors, over many counties and multiple jurisdictions being involved.

== Proof of Age hearings ==
The purpose of a Proof of Age inquisition was to establish the date of birth and thence the age of a feudal tenant-in-chief, often as part of the overall Inquisition post mortem legal process, which would establish whether he should be taken into ward. (Note: Another, although less common, occasion when someone might have to prove their age was to establish whether they were old enough to respond to a lawsuit.)

A supplicant to an inheritance had to apply to the escheator of his county of birth to prove his age, that is, that he had reached the age of majority. To do this, he, or someone on his behalf, submitted a writ de etate probanda into chancery; this effectively said, "it is about time". He would usually have his hearing, or inquisition, relatively promptly, possibly less than two months later. If there were no doubt in the matter, the escheator would generally accept the claim. If he doubted his eyes, the escheator might ask for certification as proof, although it is unknown what form this took. Medievalist Sue Sheridan Walker suggests that "written proof obviously was highly regarded and was used where it was at all possible"; Rosenthal states it holds a "privileged position" in the evidence, including not just the written document but a statement swearing it had been so recorded. Finally, the escheator could summon a jury of 12 men, all, by the nature of the proceeding, over 40 years old and knowing the supplicator, to decide the matter.

The supplicator would swear his case before them—they were his "supported memories"—at a hearing. It is unknown whether witness depositions were taken individually or collectively, nor is it known whether they were themselves cross-examined. Witnesses performed a dual role. They both provided the evidence on which the litogant based his claim and adjudged the weight of the evidence and the cases outcome. Although a clear conflict of interest, it never appears to have been viewed an issue. This panel could comprise relatives and neighbours. If the litigant was a ward of the king, the supplicant would appear in chancery, and his witnesses would be examined under oath: sub sacramentum. For example, they may be asked not only if they know the age of the litigant but also why they remember. The witnesses would provide their own names and ages and testify with personal experience, to date the birth—and why they remember it—with examples of then-current events. The historian Joel Rosenthal has described the event as a "routinized and pro forma exercise", intended to elicit memory in favour of a would-be heir; it was both a legal mechanism—the hearing itself—and then a written record of the outcome of that mechanism. In the broad context of late medieval inheritance law, historian Michael Hicks has described proofs of age as "an indispensable mechanism for succession to land and for the administration and termination of feudal, and especially royal, wardships".

Rosenthal notes that by the 15th century, it was uncommon for such hearings to find against the supplicant; indeed, Walker has suggested that when a witness did oppose a claimed age, they were generally ignored. This had financial consequences for whoever had held the land during his minority, as they had to release the lands. Rosenthal notes, however, that the wardship holder rarely objected to this and was often acquiesced to without comment and without leading to subsequent lawsuits. Indeed, although custodians were invited to the hearing procedurally, they rarely did so, although they may have sent legal representation. It was also possible to take seisin of one's estates early or, as in the case of John, Duke of Suffolk in 1462, without needing to prove one's age at all. A fine could be paid by those born abroad in respite of proving their age. Proof of Age hearings could also be overturned at a later date, as was that of Thomas, Lord de Ros in 1427. This was granted on the grounds that his brother's IPM—from whom Thomas was inheriting—had misdated his birth in one county.

=== Testimonies ===
The escheator's first question to a witness was to establish "how he remembers this after so long a lapse of time". The vast majority of witnesses based their knowledge of the child's birth by the fact of their attendance at the subsequent baptism. (Note: The medievalist William S. Deller of Tatham, Lancashire, created a database and ran a corpus comprising over 10,000 separate testimonies—from between 1246 and 1432—to analyse the most frequent language. Deller "spent many years producing for English central and local government stereotypical documents whose purpose was to fulfill or trigger bureaucratic operations".) This almost always took place the day after birth, and at the latest three days later. (Note: This followed the teachings of Thomas Aquinas, who, in his Summa Theologica stated that newborn, unbaptised babies would be stuck in limbo until released by God.) Witnesses often discussed the birth in detail; not simply place and date, for example, but also the priest's service, details of its preparation and anything else of significance. The information may not have always been first-hand; there is evidence of witnessing describing what they had been told, possibly by the family, the midwife or nurse, and even servants, especially to the supplicant's family, such as his nurse. In either case, whether they witnessed the event or not, they connected a baptism with something memorable, either of a personal or natural nature; pilgrimage is frequently a touchstone by which dates are remembered. Historical dates might also aid recollection; the coronation of Edward II and the witness's return from the Battle of Stirling Bridge were both given as reasons of remembrance. Other historical events might be of a more domestic nature; a fire in one witness's kitchen was caused by the priest holding his first mass feast there on the day of a birth. Another witness recalled that he had been so badly beaten in school that he left education the next day, when the birth took place.

Sometimes, witnesses were not themselves present at a baptism but were in the surrounding area, where they might have witnessed the procession to or from the church. They may also recall the recording of the birth rather than the birth itself. Testimonies also provide examples of normal social interaction between neighbours that took place but were not necessarily directly related to the hearing itself. Witnesses may also have been responsible for reporting the news to others, for example, a local lord, especially as they were doubtlessly rewarded for bringing it. This might also apply to those delivering the good news to the baby's father, who would not be with the mother at the birth.

=== Disputes ===
Although the vast majority of Proof of Age inquisitions went off smoothly, there are occasional anomalies in the records. Some cases are far longer than might be expected. These can sometimes be accounted for by the necessity of performing—possibly multiple—IPMs before an heir can be established. There are other occasions, says Christine Carpenter, which would seem to indicate that "sinister motives were at work". For example, in the case of the Sumpter and Armburgh family of Warwickshire, there were repeated delays to every stage of an inquisition, which indicate now-invisible machinations, says Carpenter.

Further up the social strata, although Henry, Earl of Somerset had died in 1418 at the Siege of Rouen, his IPM was not ordered for another seven years—and likewise neither was his brother and heir's Proof of Age. Carpenter speculates that "it was apparently again the impending majority of the heir" that provoked the law to take action. The legal delay to an inheritance of someone so close to the king could not have been accidental, she argues and was almost deliberately paused, per primer seisin, until no longer possible because the Beaufort estates were in the hands of John's mother Margaret. Although apparently uncommon, some supplicants are known to have been wholly fraudulent, although these are generally only known about when they were later charged with "maliciously, through suborned testimony, established a false age". Discovery appears to have been equally rare.

== Use to historians ==
Proof of Age records can provide a valuable source of information to historians. They can reveal the mentality of often lower-class people whose thoughts would otherwise never make their way into the records. They can cast light on what people chose to remember, often years later, thus suggesting what they found important at the time.

In Rosenthal's words, they "open a window on aspects of ordinary and everyday life", on people's "assumptions, habits and expectations". The precision and detail of many testimonies also tell against customary views of medieval people as being vague and perhaps slow thinking. They did not, Rosenthal notes, often refer to supernatural or mystical occurrences: the information testimonies provided was factual and "as it was—or at least as it might have been". This could include names—certainly a forename and often a surname too (rarely just "a man from the village”, for example), a felony, sometimes down to the time of day. This is information often not to be found elsewhere.

However, statements were often marked by their brevity, and as such, the records record them formulaically, repeating language when someone had effectively the same recollection; what Hicks calls "snatches of memory". Even if only a sentence long, they can reveal both the commonplace and the exceptional in everyday medieval life, particularly those of the litigant's age, whose activities were often age-specific. They also demonstrate a degree of sophistication also cast light on the witnesses' own families, and a common point made is that the baptism ties in with a major family event, such as a pregnancy, birth, death or injury. One witness, for example, could confirm the date of a baptism on account of how "Margery his wife cried like an owl and broke her right shin". Witnesses' testimony may also cast light on their own economic circumstances particularly if they gifted the baby, or its mother, at the baptism. Conversely, parent may fix the date of a baptism in a witness's mind by presenting gifts, often with the deliberate intention of passing a future inqusition (in one example, a witness was given "a cartload of wood to witness and bear in mind the age of his son John", while in another, a "white greyhound to bear in mind his son's age" was gifted). Other business matters, such as the day a contract was taken out or expired, or a purchase or sale, could date the event.

The proofs occasionally mislead. In some cases, they are characterised by circular reasoning ("I remember Richard being born because my Isabelle is the same age", for example). Sometimes the testimonies might almost be fictitious, particularly those that are near-identical. These can not be disproven, however, by the nature of being unsubstantiated by evidence. Hicks gives the example of one Walter, son of Thomas Howse of Thorpe-le-Soken in Essex. At Walter's Proof of Age hearing one of the witnesses stated he remembered Walter's baptism because he was driving a hay cart the same day when he fell and broke his left arm. This says Hicks, on its merits as evidence, "seemed promising—until, inevitably, other such accidents with hay carts materialised, in all of which it was the left arm that was broken". Walker has described witnesses as "accident prone" earlier in life, commenting that these mishaps "harmed the body but sharpened the memory". Such mishaps often involved falling from horses and breaking the right leg; she also comments on the frequency with which the left arm was broken. Rosenthal concludes that escheators were "readily convinced". However, Hicks concludes that to maintain credibility, the records had to be predominantly realistic, or no proof of age could ever have been established. The records may occasionally have been confused, particularly due to the speed with which baptisms occurred after birth. For instance, names of godparents expected to have been recorded by have been replaced by others if, for example—and appears to have been relatively frequent, says Deller—those planned for the role had not arrived in time. Also, by its nature, many years had passed, usually between 14 and 21, between the birth and the recollection.

Rosenthal has argued that Proof of Age testimonies allow historians to hear the voices of that rarely recorded medieval personage, the woman, "on whom so many of those male memories rely": memories that men garnered from their female relatives, midwives and other local woman. There are several Proofs that are submitted by women

== See also ==
- Court of Wards and Liveries
