= AZU =

AZU or Azu may refer to:

- Azu (born 1981), Japanese R&B singer
- Azubuike Ishiekwene or Azu (born 1965), Nigerian journalist
- Aji (Ryūkyū) or azu, a title of nobility in the Ryūkyū Kingdom
- AZU, several models of the Citroën 2CV automobile
- Azu, a fictional character in the 1997 video game Mahō Gakuen Lunar!

== See also ==
- Azumanga Daioh, a Japanese comedy manga by Kiyohiko Azuma
- Azurocidin 1, a protein that in humans is encoded by the AZU1 gene
- Slovenian Academy of Sciences and Arts or Slovenska akademija znanosti in umetnosti (SAZU)
- Azusa "Azu-nyan" Nakano, a character from the manga and anime series K-On!
