= Carnegie Council for Ethics in International Affairs =

Non-profit organization in the US

- Formation: 1914; 112 years ago
- Founder: Andrew Carnegie
- Type: International Relations Think tank
- Location(s): 170 East 64th Street; New York City, New York, US
- President: Joel H. Rosenthal
- Revenue: $2,515,770 (2018)
- Expenses: $3,724,969 (2018)
- Website: www.carnegiecouncil.org

The Carnegie Council for Ethics in International Affairs is a New York City–based 501(c)(3) public charity serving international affairs professionals, teachers and students, and the attentive public. Founded in 1914, and originally named Church Peace Union, Carnegie Council is an independent and nonpartisan institution, aiming to be the foremost voice of ethics in international affairs. The Council focuses on Ethics, War and Peace, Global Social Justice, and Religion in Politics as its three main themes. It is separate and independent from all other Carnegie philanthropies.

Carnegie Council publishes Ethics & International Affairs, a quarterly academic journal that examines the intersection of moral issues and the international sphere.

Among Carnegie Council's programs is Global Policy Innovations, which publishes Policy Innovations, an online magazine.

== Mission ==
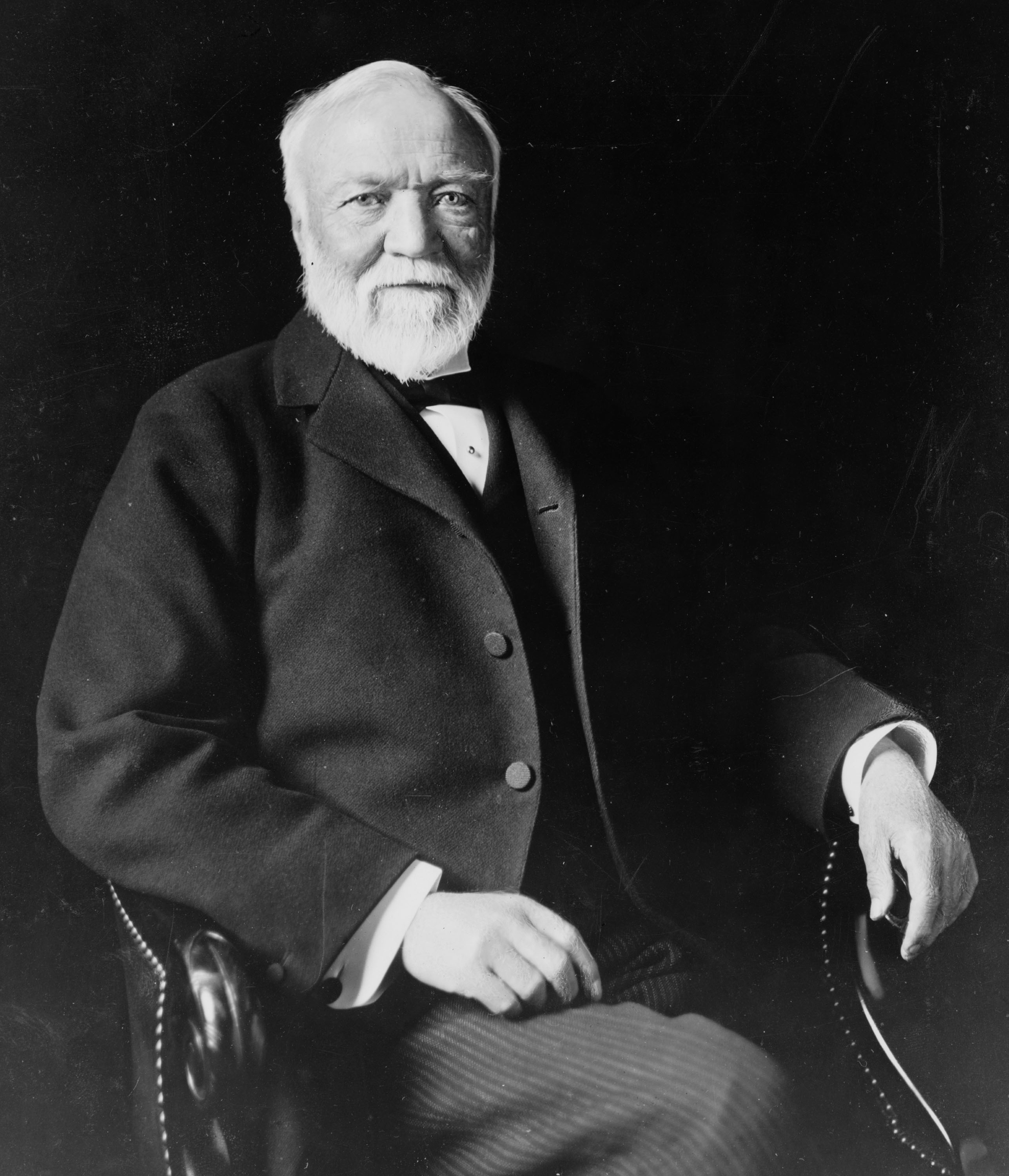
Andrew Carnegie

The Council convenes agenda-setting forums and creates educational opportunities and information resources for a worldwide audience of teachers and students, journalists, international affairs professionals, and concerned citizens. The Council's flagship publication is a quarterly scholarly journal, Ethics & International Affairs, which was launched in 1987. As an operating, rather than a grant-making foundation, the Council supports programs that it initiates and also works with partner organizations.

== History ==
=== Church Peace Union (CPU) ===
The Carnegie Council was founded in 1914 by Andrew Carnegie in New York City. Carnegie gathered together numerous religious leaders, scientists and politicians, and appointed them trustees of a new organization, the Church Peace Union (CPU). Carnegie hoped to create, with the religious and secular leaders, a new moral leadership to prevent armed conflict. The CPU was established shortly before the outbreak of World War I. The planned international inaugural meeting, on Lake Constance, could not take place due to the outbreak of war. First President of the CPU was William P. Merrill. The first activities of the organization were educational programs, calls for reductions in military spending and an end to military education in public schools.

After the declaration of war by the US President Woodrow Wilson in April 1917, which led to internal disputes within the CPU, the leadership of the organization concluded in December 1917, to stand behind Wilson and the USA’s involvement in the war. Rev. Dr. Henry A. Atkinson was General Secretary of the CPU from 1918 to 1955.

Between the World Wars, the CPU worked towards strengthening the League of Nations and promoted the American influence to resolve international conflicts. At the same time, in the 1920s, they tried to prevent an international naval arms race, and fought against discrimination of Japanese Americans. During the Great Depression, the CPU called for stronger government interventions in the economy. During World War II, the CPU supported the American government in its efforts to establish the United Nations. After World War II, the CPU helped with the establishment of the United Nations and fought for the prevention of nuclear proliferation. From 1950 to 1985, the organization published the monthly magazine Worldview.

=== Council on Religion and International Affairs (CRIA) ===
In 1961, the CPU was renamed the “Council on Religion and International Affairs” (CRIA) and appointed William A. Loos as president in 1963. Loos had been executive director since 1955. CRIA focused its work on the study of moral dimensions of a wide range of issues, especially dangers of a crusading moralism in US foreign policy. In the 1960s and 1970s, CRIA was a strong supporter of the Civil Rights Movement and led open debates on the Vietnam War. In 1977, the Council put forth the “CRIA Distinguished Lectures on Ethics and Foreign Policy,” which was later renamed the “Morgenthau Memorial Lecture.”

Robert Myers became the new president of CRIA in 1980, which the defeat of Apartheid in South Africa began in the 1980s and 1990s. Throughout this time, the Council also led programs on environmental policy and bioethics.

=== Carnegie Council on Ethics and International Affairs (CCEIA) ===
CRIA changed its name in 1986, to the “Carnegie Council on Ethics and International Affairs” (CCEIA). Since 1987, the council published its quarterly scholarly journal, Ethics & International Affairs. Successor of Robert J. Myers as president in 1995 was Joel H. Rosenthal. In the 2000s, after the attacks of 9/11 and the wars in Afghanistan and Iraq, the CCEIA fought against cruel treatment and torture.

Responding to the Rwandan and Balkans ethnic violence, the Council created the "History and the Politics of Reconciliation" program in 2000. It examined the role of history education in high schools and museums, the work of truth commissions and tribunals, and the challenges of overcoming religious divisions. The result was a series of case studies and conferences that encouraged interdisciplinary work in the field of historical memory.

=== Carnegie Council for Ethics in International Affairs ===
The current name, Carnegie Council for Ethics in International Affairs, was given to the organization in 2005.

== Funding ==
The Carnegie Council is mainly funded through an endowment from Andrew Carnegie. Other sources of funding come from grants, donations, and membership dues. The Carnegie Council is a 501(c)(3) public charity.

== Assets ==
As of 2018 the Carnegie Council for Ethics in International Affairs had Net Assets of $38,495,383.

=== Funding details ===
Funding details as of 2018:
Revenue and support as of 2018: $2,515,770
1. Other Revenue (71.7%)
2. Contributions, Gifts & Grants (25.0%)
3. Membership Dues (3.30%)
Expenses as of 2018: $3,724,969
1. Programms (69.6%)
2. Administratives (19.5%)
3. Fundraising (10.9%)

== Resources ==
Resources include transcripts, streaming audio and video, journals, book reviews, articles, papers, reports, and special reports.

=== Current publications ===
- Ethics & International Affairs - a journal that coverscovers global justice, civil society, democratization, international law, intervention, sanctions, and related topics.
- Morgenthau Lectures - Named after international relations scholar Hans Morgenthau, this annual lecture series has speakers on ethics and international affairs."

== Programs ==
Carnegie Council's programs include the following (Christian Barry was the program officer):

- Public Affairs – consisting of more than 50 events each year, in which the speakers include authors, Nobel laureates, UN officials, and people from the world of international affairs.
- US Global Engagement – is focused on the U.S. relations with partners throughout the established democracies, problematical allies, and states of deep concern.
- American Leadership Series – an independent program that evaluated various topics related to ethics in international security, and is a partnership between the Center for National American Security (CNSA) and Carnegie Council for Ethics in International Affairs.
- Ethics Matter – lectures about ethics with speakers from different backgrounds, countries and professions.
- Carnegie New Leaders – on global and ethical matters.
- Global Ethics Network – a platform allowing educational institutions and individuals around the world to discuss international affairs by creating and sharing multimedia resources.
- 100 Carnegie Council – in celebration of the Carnegie Council's 100s anniversary, the Ethics for a Connected World was put into place as a three-year project aimed at public intellectuals, business leaders, policymakers, religious leaders, students, and educators worldwide.
- Global Ethical Dialogues – a multi-year project, which is part of the Council's Centennial programs, involving societies across the world.
- AI & Equality Initiative – a project directed at understanding the innumerable ways in which artificial intelligence impacts equality for better or for worse.

== Notable authors and speakers ==
- Bjørn Lomborg
- Peter Singer
- Zbigniew Brzezinski
- Thomas Friedman
- Bernard Lewis
- William Kristol
- Michael Novak
- Richard Posner
- Kemal Derviş
- Lewis H. Lapham
- Paul Krugman
- Robert Reich
- Shirin Ebadi
- Jeffrey Sachs
- Anthony Lake
- Bruce Weinstein
- Mark Danner
- Baroness Emma Nicholson of Winterbourne
- Edward Luttwak
- Alain Juppé
- Mark Bowden
- Ahmed Rashid
- Robert Drinan
- John Shattuck
- James Gustave (Gus) Speth
- Noah Feldman
- Jeremy Greenstock
- Jagdish Bhagwati
- Max Boot
- Natan Sharansky
- Cass Sunstein
- Lou Dobbs
- António Vitorino
- Robert Kagan
- Morton Halperin
- Bernard Kouchner
- Timothy Garton Ash
- Hilde Frafjord Johnson
- Kwame Anthony Appiah
- Gilles Kepel
- Jonathan Sacks
- Paul Kennedy
- John Esposito
- Mark Malloch Brown
- Dennis Ross
- Benjamin Barber
- George Weigel
- Lester R. Brown
- Alexander Stille
- Maude Barlow
- Andrew Bacevich
- William F. Schulz
- Graham T. Allison
- Paul Berman
- Álvaro Vargas Llosa
- Larry Diamond
- Tom Diaz
- Ian Bremmer
- James Chace
- Samantha Power
- Kishore Mahbubani
- Anne-Marie Slaughter
- Alan Wolfe
- Walter Russell Mead
- John Hutson
- Lionel Barber
- Steve Coll
- Ken Auletta
- John Judis
- Philip Jenkins
- Roy Gutman
- Jonathan Cristol
- Donald Gregg
- Warren Zimmermann
- Ian Martin
- Kenneth Frampton
- John Micklethwait
- Adrian Wooldridge
- David P. Calleo
- William Easterly
- Jean-Marie Guéhenno
- Michael Ignatieff
- Clyde V. Prestowitz Jr.
- Richard Cizik
- David M. Malone
- Elaine Scarry

== See also ==
- Policy Innovations Magazine
