= Policy Innovations =

Online magazine

- Website type: Online magazine
- Available in: English
- Dissolved: May 2016
- Owner: Carnegie Council for Ethics in International Affairs
- Website: www.policyinnovations.org
- Commercial: No
- Launched: September 6, 2006; 20 years ago

Policy Innovations was an online magazine devoted to news and analysis examining local solutions to global challenges facing today's interconnected world. It covered the future of cities, education, environment, food, health, gender, and technology. Policy Innovations was a global conversation about new ways of thinking. It also invited commentary on NGOs, social enterprises, companies and entrepreneurs such as Nobel Prize-winner Muhammad Yunus, who are driving change.

Policy Innovations was a nonprofit media venture housed at the Carnegie Council for Ethics in International Affairs in New York City. The project began in 2004 with funding from the Rockefeller Brothers Fund, and the magazine component launched on September 6, 2006.

Madeleine Lynn was the managing editor. The magazine closed in May 2016.

== Contributors and Advisors ==
- David Abshire
- Philip Auerswald
- Harriet Babbit
- Steve Clemons
- Jean-Marc Coicaud
- Jayati Ghosh
- Nikolas Gvosdev
- Sasha Issenberg
- Jomo K.S.
- Sherman Katz
- Rebecca MacKinnon
- Neela Marikkar
- Moisés Naím
- Thomas Pogge
- Iqbal Quadir
- Mary Robinson
- Jeffrey Sachs
- Peter Singer
- Jerry Sternin
- Joseph Stiglitz
