= Leadership (newspaper) =

Nigerian English daily newspaper

Leadership News
- Type: Daily newspaper
- Owner: Sam Nda-Isaiah
- Publisher: Leadership Newspaper Group
- Editor-in-chief: Azubuike Ishiekwene
- Founded: 2001
- Language: English; Hausa (A Yau)
- Headquarters: Abuja, Nigeria
- Website: leadership.ng

Leadership is a Nigerian daily national newspaper. It was established in October 2004 by Sam Nda-Isaiah, a pharmacist cum businessman and politician, and is published by Leadership Newspaper Group based in Abuja, Nigeria. On its website, the paper asserts: "We shall stand up for good governance. We shall defend the interests of the Nigerian state even against its leaders and we shall raise our pen at all times in defence of what is right. These are the values by which we intend to be assessed".

Leadership is better known as Leadership News because of its new offerings which includes Podcast, Fashion Magazine (LeVogue) and National Economy.

== History ==
On 9 January 2007 a dozen State Security Service agents stormed the Leadership offices and arrested general manager Abraham Nda-Isaiah, editor Bashir Bello Akko and journalist Abdulazeez Sanni. The cause was an article written by journalist Danladi Ndayebo that discussed the political maneuvers in the ruling People's Democratic Party (PDP) party that led to nomination of Umaru Musa Yar'Adua as presidential candidate. On 6 May 2008 a squad of armed, plain-clothed policemen from the Niger State Command raided the Leadership head office and arrested the deputy editor, Danladi Ndayebo, apparently without any warrant. According to a staff writer, Prince Charles Dickson, the cause was a feature article said to have defamed the character of Senator Isa Mohammed.

In December 2009, the Nigeria Union of Journalists named Leadership "Newspaper of the Year". The award was accepted by Abraham Nda-Isaiah, its Group Executive Director. In a restructuring effective 1 January 2011, Azubuike Ishiekwene was appointed the first managing director of Leadership Newspapers, while Abraham Nda-Isaiah became managing director of Leadership Holdings. Ishiekwene had formerly been editor of The Punch, and then executive director of that newspaper. In the April 2011 elections Golu Timothy, a former editor of the newspaper, was elected to the State House of Assembly in the Kanke Constituency of Plateau State. He ran on the PDP platform. Golu was reported to be seeking the position of Speaker in the Plateau House of Assembly.

On 17 July 2013 the Leadership reprinted the writer Shai Afsai's photographs and first-person article "Igbo Jews of Nigeria Strive to Study and Practice" under the title "Igbo-Jews Of Nigeria Study And Practise Judaism," while citing the Leadership's Igho Oyoyo as its author. After being threatened with legal action by the New English Review's editor, the Leadership issued a corrected byline and an apology for the plagiarism ten days later, on 26 July 2013.

The chairman and publisher of Leadership, Mr. Sam Nda-Isaiah, died suddenly on 12 December 2020. His wife, Zainab, stepped in as chairman in February 2021. A few administrative changes saw Azubuike Ishiekwene, who had left the company previously, coming back as editor-in-chief.
