= World Policy Journal =

Defunct American international relations journal

- Editor: Jessica Loudis
- Categories: International relations and Political Science
- Frequency: Quarterly
- Publisher: Duke University Press for the World Policy Institute
- First issue: 1984
- Final issue Number: 2017; 34 (4)
- Country: United States
- Based in: New York City
- Language: English
- Website: worldpolicy.org/journal/
- ISSN: 0740-2775 (print); 1936-0924 (web)
- OCLC: 38482151

World Policy Journal was the flagship publication of the World Policy Institute, published by Duke University Press. Focusing on international relations, the publication provided left-wing, non-United States-centric perspectives to world issues. It contained primarily policy essays but also book reviews, interviews, and historical essays. Most articles were commissioned. The last print issue of the journal was published in Winter 2017.

== Notable articles and authors ==
In March 2000, the Congressional Research Service (CRS) ranked the journal as one of the top foreign policy publications in the United States, along with Foreign Affairs and Foreign Policy, because of the quality and expert opinion of pieces written on the US global role for the post-Cold War era. The CRS named nine influential articles that appeared in World Policy Journal, such as Sidney Blumenthal's analysis on "The Return of the Repressed Anti-Internationalism and the American Right", Paul Kennedy's "The Next American Century?", and articles by David Calleo, Hugh DeSantis, Christopher Layne, Charles William Maynes, William Pfaff, Joel H. Rosenthal and David Unger.

Material from the journal was sometimes republished as books, such as Ahmed Rashid's Jihad, Rajan Menon's End of Alliances, and Brian Steidle's The Devil Came on Horseback.

== Editors ==
Former editors were Christopher Shay (2015–2016), Sherle R. Schwenninger (1982–1991), Richard Caplan (1991–1992), James Chace (1993–2000), Karl E. Meyer (2000–2008), and David A. Andelman (2008–2015).

Benjamin Schwarz was the executive editor from 1996 to 1998. Former managing editors included Yaffa Fredrick, Christopher Shay, Justin Vogt, Ryan Bradley, Linda Wrigley, and Benjamin Pauker.

Patrick Coleff, the Digital Access and Books Specialist for Duke University Press stated: "The owner of World Policy Journal, the World Policy Institute, is in a time of transition, and it was unclear when the journal will resume publication."

== Abstracting and indexing ==
World Policy Journal is abstracted and indexed in Academic Search Elite, Academic Search Premier, Arts and Humanities Search, PubMed, Scopus, and the Social Sciences Citation Index.

== Editorial board ==
In 2016 the editorial board had the following members:

- Seymour Topping, Columbia University (Chairman)
- Sulaiman Al-Hattlan, HattPost Media
- Eric Alterman, World Policy Institute
- Sidney Blumenthal, Author
- Ying Chan, The University of Hong Kong
- Mark Danner, The New York Review of Books
- Kate Doyle, National Security Archive
- Naresh Fernandes, Scroll.in
- David Fromkin, Boston University
- John Maxwell Hamilton, Louisiana State University
- James F. Hoge Jr., Center for Global Affairs, NYU
- Aziz Z. Huq, University of Chicago Law School
- Azubuike lshiekwene, Punch Newspaper Group, Nigeria
- Peter B. Kaufman, Intelligent Television
- Paul Kelly, The Australian
- Anne Nelson, Columbia University
- Peter Osnos, PublicAffairs Books
- Jennifer Ramos, Loyola Marymount University
- Sherle R. Schwenninger, World Policy Institute
- Nancy E. Soderberg, Connect U.S. Fund
- Ronald Steel, University of Southern California
- Paul Steiger, ProPublica
- Angela E. Stent, Georgetown University
- Patrick Wajsman, Politique Internationale
- Martin Walker, World Policy Institute
- Ruth Wedgwood, Johns Hopkins University, SAIS

== Criticism ==
In June 1991, authors Steven Emerson and Cristina del Sesto wrote that World Policy Journal is "a publication with a clear bias toward a pro-P.L.O. point of view", and that "In the entire history of that quarterly's publication, there has never been one analysis presenting the Israeli mainstream point of view." World Policy Institute senior fellow Eric Alterman characterized their critique as "wild aspersions".

== Praise ==
In a 2002 article, The New York Times described the magazine as "one of the voices of dissent in how the United States carries out the war on terror abroad", stating: "The World Policy Journal has little of the money or reach of Foreign Affairs, its august rival uptown. But it has a place. 'It is a thoughtful journal,' said James F. Hoge Jr., the editor of Foreign Affairs, which publishes articles by more mainstream political figures. 'It makes an effort to get views that may not find a home in more established publications like ours.'"
