= David Unger =

David Unger may refer to:

- David A. Unger (born 1971), film talent and literary agent
- David C. Unger (born 1947), American journalist

== See also ==
- David Ungar (born 1954), American computer scientist
