= Ethics & International Affairs =

- Discipline: Ethics, international relations, political science
- Language: English
- Edited by: Joel H. Rosenthal, John Tessitore, Adam Read-Brown, John Krzyzaniak

Publication details
- History: 1987-present
- Publisher: Cambridge University Press on behalf of the Carnegie Council for Ethics in International Affairs
- Frequency: Quarterly
- Impact factor: 0.576 (2015)

Standard abbreviations
- ISO 4: Ethics Int. Aff.

Indexing
- ISSN: 0892-6794 (print); 1747-7093 (web)
- LCCN: 87648671
- OCLC no.: 795956768

Links
- Journal homepage; Online access; Online archive; Journal page at Carnegie Council website

Ethics & International Affairs is a quarterly peer-reviewed academic journal covering ethical aspects of international relations. It was established in 1987 and is published by Cambridge University Press on behalf of Carnegie Council for Ethics in International Affairs. Topics covered in the journal range from global justice, democratization, and international law, to human rights and women's rights. The current editorial team is: Joel H. Rosenthal (editor in chief), Adam Read-Brown (managing editor), and Priya Chokshi (associate editor), all at Carnegie Council.

== Abstracting and indexing ==
The journal is abstracted and indexed in American Bibliography of Slavic and East European Studies, CSA Worldwide Political Science Abstracts, International Bibliography of the Social Sciences, International Political Science Abstracts, Lancaster Index to Defence & International Security Literature, PAIS International in Print, Philosopher's Index, Social Sciences Index, and Periodica Islamica.

According to the Journal Citation Reports, the journal has a 2015 impact factor of 0.576, ranking it 36th out of 51 journals in the category "Ethics".

== See also ==
- List of ethics journals
