= David C. Unger =

American journalist

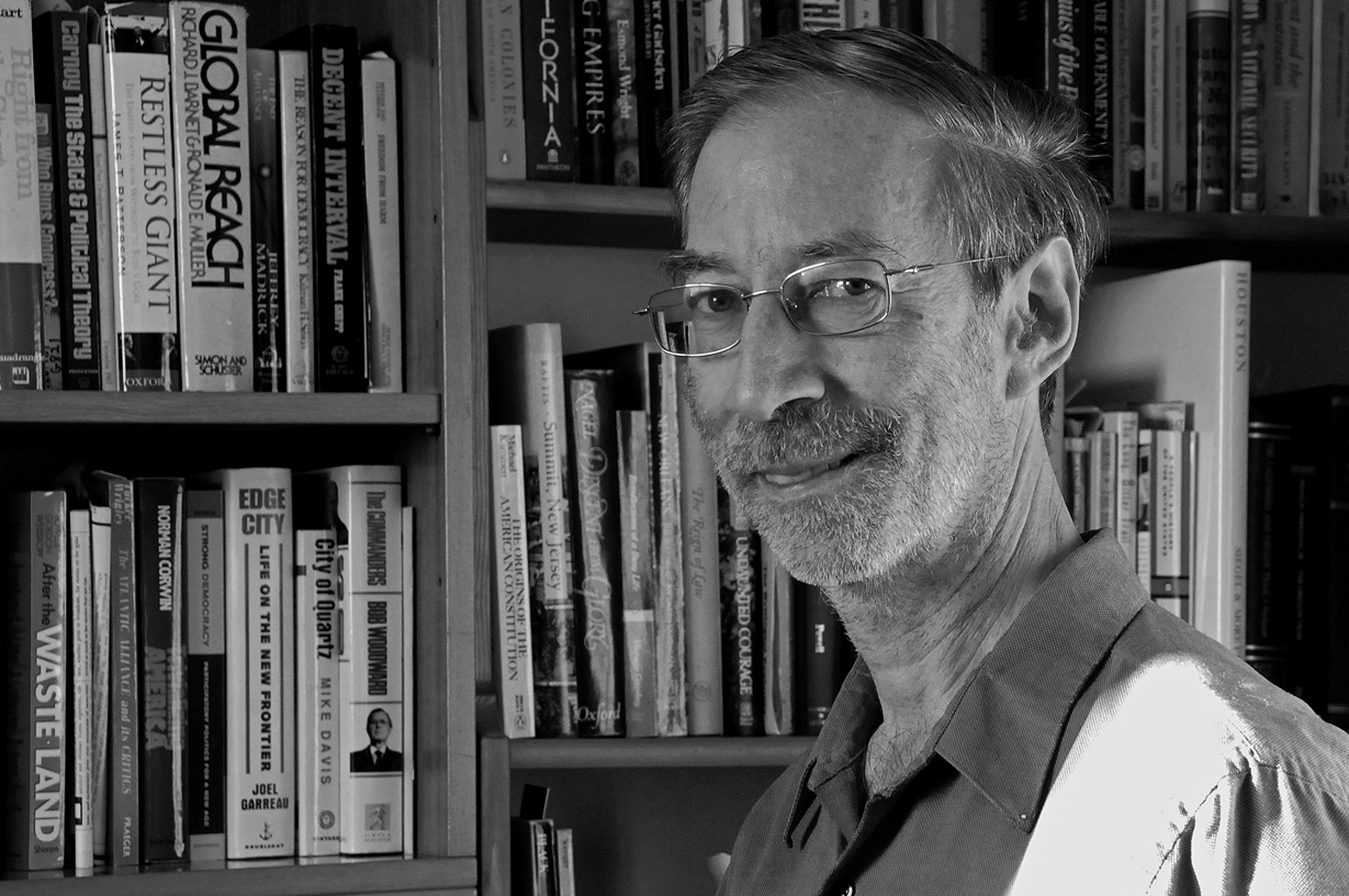
- David Unger on January 3, 2009 in Genoa (photo by Markus Wiedemeier)
- Born: March 5, 1947 (age 79); Brooklyn, New York, US
- Education: Cornell University; University of Texas; University of Wisconsin, Madison; University of London
- Occupation: Journalist
- Notable credit: The New York Times
- Title: Foreign Affairs Writer, Editorial Board Member
- Spouse: Kathleen Quinn

David C. Unger (b. March 5, 1947, in Brooklyn, NY, USA) is a journalist, former foreign affairs editorial writer for The New York Times (1977–2013) and author of the book The Emergency State. He is currently an adjunct professor of American Foreign Policy at Johns Hopkins University, School of Advanced International Studies Europe, at Bologna and Contributing Editor at Survival.

Unger received an A.B. in History and Comparative Literature from Cornell University, a Ph.D. from the University of Texas, Austin and has done additional graduate studies at the University of Wisconsin, Madison and the Institute for Historical Research, University of London.

He studied American foreign policy with Walter LaFeber at Cornell, economic history with W.W. Rostow and M.M. Postan at the University of Texas, and British labor history with E.J. Hobsbawm at the University of London.

== Early life ==
Unger grew up in Brooklyn and attended New York City public schools through high school. After receiving his bachelor's from Cornell he worked as an elementary school teacher in public schools in Brooklyn and Staten Island for three years.

He began work at The New York Times in 1977 as a news clerk for its editorial board while completing his doctorate from the University of Texas.

== Writing ==
In addition to numerous articles he has written for The New York Times and other periodicals, Unger wrote the book, The Emergency State (published 2012) in which, according to a review in The New York Times, he "...deplores what he sees as Washington’s obsession with security and overreliance on military and intelligence capabilities, arguing that they are dangerous perversions of the country’s Jeffersonian traditions."

Other recent publications include chapters he contributed to Origins of the National Security State and The Legacy of Harry S. Truman (2015) and a 2013 Italian-language book, 22 novembre 1963, Il giorno in cui ci svegliammo dal sogno cinquat'anni dopo: JFK visto dagli americani d'Italia (22 November 1963, Fifty years after the day we woke from the dream: Views of JFK by Americans in Italy) titled, "Un americano amico dell’Europa" ("An American Friend of Europe"). His essay, "A Better Internationalism" was published in the spring, 2012 edition of World Policy Journal.

== Professional organizations ==
Unger has been a member of the Council on Foreign Relations since 1989; the Foreign Policy Roundtable, in New York City (from 1997 to 2007); a presenter and discussion leader at the Carnegie Council for Ethics in International Affairs - on topics such as Wealth and Terror: Why America’s Quest for Absolute Security Is a Mission Impossible that Can Also Destroy Our Democracy (2007) and Maps of War, Maps of Peace: Finding a Two-State Solution to the Israeli-Palestinian Question (2002) - and a guest seminar leader at the Centre for International Studies and Diplomacy, School of Oriental and African Studies, University of London, on Obama and U.S. Foreign Policy (Nov., 2008).

== Languages ==
In addition to his native English, Unger speaks, reads and writes French, Italian and Spanish.

== Selected publications ==
- The Emergency State:How to End America’s Obsessive Quest for National Security and Reclaim our Democracy ISBN 978-1-59420-324-4 Penguin Press (February 16, 2012)
- Review of Innocent Abroad, The New York Times Book Review, Feb 1, 2009
- Over 3,000 foreign policy editorials published in The New York Times (1977-2013)
- Unger, David C. "Articles in The New York Times by David Unger". The New York Times.
- Unger, David. "Un americano amico dell'Europa" ("An American Friend of Europe"), 22 novembre 1963, Il giorno in cui ci svegliammo dal sogno cinquat'anni dopo: JFK visto dagli americani d'Italia (22 November 1963, Fifty years after the day we woke from the dream: Views of JFK by Americans in Italy), Monti; Saronno, Italy, 2013
- "A Better Internationalism," World Policy Journal, Spring 2012
- The Inevitable Two State Solution, World Policy Journal, Fall, 2008
- Maps of War, Maps of Peace: Finding a Two-State Solution to the Israeli-Palestinian Question World Policy Journal, Summer, 2002
- Asian Anxieties, Pacific Overtures: Experiments in Security for a New Asia-Pacific Community, World Policy Journal, Summer, 1994
- A media collection of The Emergency State
- “The Politics and Political Legacy of Harry S. Truman's National Security Policies” Origins of the National Security State and the Legacy of Harry S. Truman (Truman Legacy Series, Vol. 11), 2015

== Selected presentations ==
- "The US-Italy relationship in a Changing World" (Panel discussion sponsored by Istituto Affair Internazionale and US Embassy, Rome (May 2018)
- "America First, Political and Cultural Nationalism in the US" (Centro di Studi Americani e Transatlantici P. Bairati, Universita di Torino (December 2017)
- "How the National Security Act of 1947 built the foundations for a peacetime national security state" (Panel discussion, American Historical Association, Denver, USA (Jan. 7, 2017)
- "Post US Presidential Elections – The foreign policy debate" (Panel discussion, Johns Hopkins University, SAIS Europe Bologna, Italy (Dec. 5, 2016)
- "The Election of Donald Trump: What does It mean for Europe, the world, and the United States?" (Faculty of Political Science, University of Cagliari, Italy (Nov. 22, 2016)

== Television appearance ==
- Jeff Glor interviews David Unger about his book The Emergency State: America's Pursuit of Absolute Security at All Costs; CBS News, March 8, 2012

== Website ==
- Webpage on David C. Unger, Adjunct Professor of American Foreign Policy, School of Advanced International Studies
