= Rebecca Chace =

American novelist

Rebecca Chace is an American novelist, playwright, screenwriter, and actor. She is the author of the novel Leaving Rock Harbor (2010), which was recognized as an Editors’ Choice by The New York Times, a June Indie Notable Book by the American Booksellers Association, and a finalist for the New England Book Award. Chace's novel Capture the Flag (1999), has been adapted for the screen with director Lisanne Skyler. The film was awarded the Showtime Tony Cox Screenplay Award (Short Film) at the 2010 Nantucket Film Festival. She has also published the memoir Chautauqua Summer (1993), and her first children's novel June Sparrow and the Million Dollar Penny (2017). Her plays include Colette (Theater for the New City) and an adaptation of Kate Chopin's novel The Awakening (Book-It Repertory Theater).

Chace has written for many publications including The New York Times Magazine, the Huffington Post, and NPR's All Things Considered.

Chace was a 2016 Writing Fellow at Dora Maar House, a 2015-2016 member of the Wertheim Study at the New York Public Library, and the 2014 recipient of the Grace Paley Fiction Fellowship at the Vermont Studio Center. She has received fellowships and residencies from the MacDowell Colony, Yaddo, Jentel, Ragdale, and others.

Chace holds degrees from the Tisch School of the Arts Graduate Acting Program and the Bennington Writing Seminars (Fiction MFA). She currently resides in Brooklyn, New York and is an Associate Professor of Creative Writing and Director of the MA Program in Creative Writing and Literature at Fairleigh Dickinson University.

Chace is the daughter of the poet Jean Valentine and the historian James Chace. In House of SpeakEasy’s Seriously Entertaining program, Chace talks about living in an Upper West Side apartment with her mother as a teenager, “she taught me so much about words and language.”
