= Sam Nda-Isaiah =

Chairman Leadership Newspaper, Nigerian politician

Aare Baaroyin Sam Ndanusa Isaiah
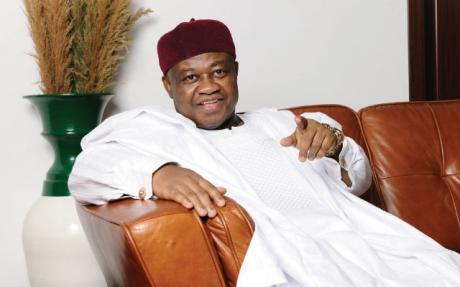
- Born: Samuel Isaiah; 1 May 1962; Minna, Niger, Nigeria
- Died: 11 December 2020 (aged 58); Abuja, Nigeria
- Education: National University of Singapore; Obafemi Awolowo University
- Alma mater: Obafemi Awolowo University
- Occupations: Political columnist journalist entrepreneur
- Notable work: Leadership Newspaper; NIGERIA: FULL DISCLOSURE (newspaper column)
- Title: Chairman of Leadership Newspaper Group
- Term: 2013–2015
- Political party: All Progressive Congress (2015–2020)

Samuel Ndanusa Isaiah (1 May 1962 – 11 December 2020), commonly known as Sam Nda-Isaiah, was a Nigerian political columnist, pharmacist, entrepreneur and journalist. He was the founder and chairman of the Leadership Newspaper.

== Background ==
Nda-Isaiah was born in Minna, Nigeria. He attended UNA Elementary School before switching to Christ Church School, Kaduna in 1968. He later went on to study at Federal Government College, Kaduna, from 1974 to 1979. After graduating, he was admitted to Obafemi Awolowo University and studied pharmaceuticals. At that time, he participated in the Kaduna State Schools Challenge, a quiz organized by the Kaduna Education Board, and won first prize. He also enrolled in the Lee Kuan Yew School of Public Policy at the National University of Singapore. He completed a mandatory year of the National Youth Services Corps at the Ekiti General Hospital and the Ekiti State Hospital in 1984.

=== Career ===
Nda-Isaiah briefly worked as a pharmacist at the Kano Specialist Hospital before moving to General Hospital, Minna. He worked at Pfizer Products Limited from 1985 to 1989. He began his columnist work with The Daily Trust editorial board as a board member and worked as a committee member in the Kano State Government to revive The Triumph, a Kano owned newspaper. In 2003, he headed Mohammadu Buhari's presidential campaign publicities.

He was a member of the Asian think-tank, the Global Institute for Tomorrow in Hong Kong. In 2019 he was appointed board member of the Baze University.

Serial Entrepreneur

Beyond media business, Nda-Isaiah acted as chairman or board member of diverse companies in areas including fish farming and security services, pharmaceutical goods manufacturing, educational books publishing, e-payment, real estate, agribusiness, e-learning, telecommunications, parcel delivery, online shopping, data processing, biofuel and hospitality, park and recreation, among others.

He was the founder and chairman of Leadership Newspapers Group., LeadershipHQ Limited, 234Register.com Limited and Leadership Holdings Ltd, and Leadership Governance Index.

He was also the Chairman of Lease Praxis Ltd, Oakhouse Forte Ltd, Allan Woods Ltd. (an education company modelled after the Washington Post Company), Free Press Ltd, The Outsource Company Ltd (a BPO and international call centre), Integrat Mobile Aggregation Services Limited (a subsidiary of Integrat South Africa), Grayston 77 Limited, PPSG Group, KhromePay Ltd, KhromeCompany, KhromeMonkey, AllFarms Ltd, Graham Foggs Ltd, Forte Agra Ltd, World Wide Canine Nigeria Ltd, Palm Rock Ltd, Mineral House Ltd, Pural Holdings Ltd, Leadership Wealth Ltd, Leadership General Ltd, Robertsham Hotel in Johannesburg, South Africa, QC Analytica, Brainstormr, Parcelmann, Leadership House Ltd – the investment company, and QXA – a fertiliser concern.

He was a director of MAP Plc, Maitama Club, Empire Securities Ltd, and Health Reform Foundation of Nigeria.

Sam was the initiator of National Affordable Medicines Initiative, an initiative to supply cheap, quality and affordable drugs to all Nigerians, a move that obtained the President's seal of approval and the setting up of a presidential working committee to actualise.

Awards, Titles and Affiliations

Sam's relentless endeavours were acknowledged and rewarded some traditional rulers and institutions who gave him special recognition for his contributions to humanity and nation building.

In 2011, he was conferred with the traditional title of Kakaki Nupe by Etsu Nupe His Highness Dr Yahaya Abubakar, CFR. At the turbaning ceremony, the Sultan of Sokoto sent him a special gift of a horse. This was a rare honour. He was the only one of the 11 title recipients that received the Sultan's gift on that day.

He is also the Jakadan Potiskum, a title conferred on him by the Mai Potiskum, Alhaji Umar Ibn Bubaram.

In 2013, he was conferred with Ugwumba Ndigbo by the Igbo community in Abuja and last year, he was conferred with the title of Aare Baroyin of Akure land by the Deji of Akure.

Sam also received the Nupe Kingdom Lifetime Achievement Award for Entrepreneurship.

He was conferred with the Grand Commander of Great Ife, the highest honour conferred by the Ife Alumni on its members in 2013; there are fewer than 20 such recipients in the world today.

He was also a fellow of the Pharmaceutical Society of Nigeria (PSN) and a member of the Pharmaceutical Council of Nigeria.

The shift of global economic power from the West to the East engaged Sam's interest. He is a member of the Asian think-tank, the Global Institute for Tomorrow (GIFT) based in Hong Kong, an association that took him to numerous brainstorming sessions in Singapore, China, India and Hong Kong in search of solutions to today's global problems and the promise for tomorrow.

Sam is an alumnus of the Lee Kuan Yew School of Public Policy of the National University of Singapore and also of the School of International and Public Affairs of Columbia University, New York. He is the Chairman of Abuja Beijing Consensus (ABC).

Sam was a member of the Institute of Directors, a member of the Vienna-based International Press Institute, a member of the World Association of Newspapers and an executive member of the Newspaper Proprietors' Association of Nigeria.

He was also a member of the Board of Trustees of Nupe Foundation as well as a member of Board of Trustees of Baze University, Abuja, and the founder of SamLeadership Foundation.

Sam was a member of the Northern Elders' Forum and the Vice Chairman of its think tank. He was also one of the brains behind the formation of North Central People's Forum, a political pressure group in the Middle Belt.

Mentor

Sam was a reputable businessman. Many of his former employees have given him credit for their own successes. Some of his former employees include David Chinda (Development Bank), Azu Ishiekwene (Publisher, The Interview), Emmanuel Bello (former Commissioner of Information, Taraba State), Bashir Ahmed (Presidential Aide), Nnaa Kalu Nto (Founder, Analytix), Tobi Johannes (Presidential Media Group), Hon Golu Timothy (former National Assembly member from Plateau State), Mr Danladi Ndayebo (former Commissioner for Information, Niger State).

== Leadership Newspaper Group ==
In 2001, he founded the Leadership Newspaper Group. He wrote Nigeria: Full Disclosure: Selected Writings on Governance, Democracy and Statecraft, May 1999 – March 2004 and raised around 17 million naira to fund the group.

He had a weekly column in Daily Trust titled "Last Word and Earshot". After that he established the Leadership Newspaper, where the column became one of the most popular in Nigeria.

== Educational honors ==
- Bsc Pharmacy, Obafemi Awolowo University, Ile-Ife

== Politics ==
In 2015 ran for presidency with All Progressives Congress after suspending his columnist ambition, but he lost to Muhammadu Buhari in the primaries.

He was conferred with the chieftaincy title "Aare Baaroyin of Akure Kingdom" by Oba Aladetoyinbo Ogunlade Aladelusi, Odundun.

== Death ==
Nda-Isaiah died on 11 December 2020 from COVID-19.

== Book ==
- Management of social conflict in a plural society. Mahmood Yakubu; Sam Nda-Isaiah, Bukar Zarma, Kaduna, Nigeria, Arewa Consultative Forum, 2003. Conference publication; Conference papers and proceedings Congresses. ISBN 9783505467, 9789783505469, OCLC 85772620
- Nigeria; full disclosure: selected writings on governance, democracy and statecraft, May 1999 – March 2004, Sam Nda-Isaiah, Abuja, Free Press, Subjects Nigeria—Politics and government, 1993–2007. Politics and government, Sam Nda-Isaiah. ISBN 9783721801, 9789783721807, OCLC 70292374
- Judgment to lead. Uche Odika Junior, Xlibris, 2014, Nda-Isaiah, Sam. Nigeria – Economic conditions—1970– Nigeria—Politics and government—2007–. Named Person: Sam Nda-Isaiah, ISBN 9781499085914, 1499085915, OCLC 883376652

== Bibliography ==
- Nigeria: Full Disclosure; Selected Writings on Governance, Democracy and Statecraft, May 1999/March 2004, S. Nda-Isaiah. Free Press 2004, ISBN 9783721801, ISBN 9789783721807
- Judgment to Lead: A Conversation with Sam Nda-Isaiah (Kakaki Nupe), Uche Odika Junior, Xlibris Corporation LLC, 2014. ISBN 1499085893, ISBN 9781499085891, 216 pages
