= Joan Bingham =

American editor (1935–2020)

- Born: Joan Williamson Stevens; March 5, 1935; Steubenville, Ohio
- Died: October 31, 2020 (aged 85); Manhattan, New York City
- Education: Connecticut College
- Children: Robert Worth Bingham IV (died in 1999), Clara Bingham
- Parents: Edward Williamson Stevens (father); Helen Williamson Stevens (mother)

Joan Bingham (March 5, 1935 – October 31, 2020) was a co-founder and long-time executive editor of independent publishing house Grove Atlantic.

== Biography ==
Bingham was born in Steubenville, Ohio to Edward and Helen Williamson Stevens. Her father was the chief executive of United Oil Company in Pittsburgh. Bingham graduated in art history from Connecticut College in 1957 and received a master's in European history from Georgetown University in the 1980s.

Bingham married Robert Worth Bingham III in 1960. Robert died in a freak accident in 1966.

She was briefly married to George Packard in the late 1970s. James Chace was a long time companion of Bingham.

Bingham helped found the Grove Atlantic in 1993 and was instrumental in acquiring and publishing writers including Kiran Desai and Kay Ryan. Former colleague Juliet Nicolson described her as "an indefatigable champion for her authors".

Her son Robert died from a drug overdose in 1999.

She died in Manhattan from pneumonia.
