= David A. Andelman =

American editor and businessperson

- Born: October 1944 (age 82)
- Education: A.B. Harvard College; M.S. Columbia University Graduate School of Journalism
- Occupation: Journalist

David A. Andelman (born October 6, 1944) is an American journalist, historian, editor, and commentator whose career has spanned newspapers, magazines, television, radio, and digital media. Andelman has reported from more than 90 countries, and has served in senior editorial and correspondent roles at The New York Times, CBS News, Bloomberg News, Forbes, and World Policy Journal.

== Biography ==
Andelman is the son of Selma (née Nathanson) and Saul Andelman. Born in Cambridge, Massachusetts, his father was an attorney in Boston. He was a cum laude graduate of Harvard College in 1966 where he majored in history and was news director of the college radio station WHRB and of the Columbia University Graduate School of Journalism.

== Career ==
Andelman served as Southeast Asia bureau chief for The New York Times, based in Bangkok, and later as Eastern Europe bureau chief, based in Belgrade. During this period, he reported on major geopolitical developments including the communist takeovers of Cambodia and Laos, then chronicled political transformations in Eastern Europe.

Andelman was the editor of World Policy Journal from 2008 to 2015. Following The New York Times, he served for seven years as Paris correspondent for CBS News. He has also worked in editorial roles at Forbes, Bloomberg News, CNBC, and The New York Daily News. From 2010 to 2012, he served as president of the Overseas Press Club.

Andelman was awarded the 2019 Deadline Club Award for Commentary for his CNN and Reuters columns. In 2021, France president Emmanuel Macron named Andelman a chevalier of the Legion of Honor for his work as a journalist and "for his lifelong commitment to promoting better understanding between French and American citizens."

== Books ==
- David A. Andelman, The Peacemakers, Harper & Row Publishers, 1973, ISBN 0-06-553106-X
- Alexandre De Marenches and David A. Andelman, The Fourth World War: Diplomacy and Espionage in the Age of Terrorism, William Morrow & Co, 1992, ISBN 0-688-09218-7
- David A. Andelman, A Shattered Peace: Versailles 1919 and the Price We Pay Today, John Wiley Publishers, 2007, with a new (2015) Centennial Edition and foreword by Sir Harold Evans, ISBN 978-0-471-78898-0
- Guillaume Serina, David A. Andelman (translator, afterword), An Impossible Dream: Reagan, Gorbachev, and a World Without the Bomb, Pegasus Books, 2019, ISBN 978-1643130842
- David A. Andelman, A Red Line in the Sand: Diplomacy, Strategy, and the History of Wars that Might Still Happen, Pegasus Books, 2021 ISBN 978-1643136486
