= Poet Laureate of New York =

The State Poet of New York is the poet laureate for the U.S. state of New York. The position of New York State Poet was established by a special mandate of the New York State Legislature on August 1, 1985. In 1988, New York also established a position for other genres of writing entitled New York State Author. In 2016, Governor Cuomo also named Joseph Tusiani poet laureate emeritus.

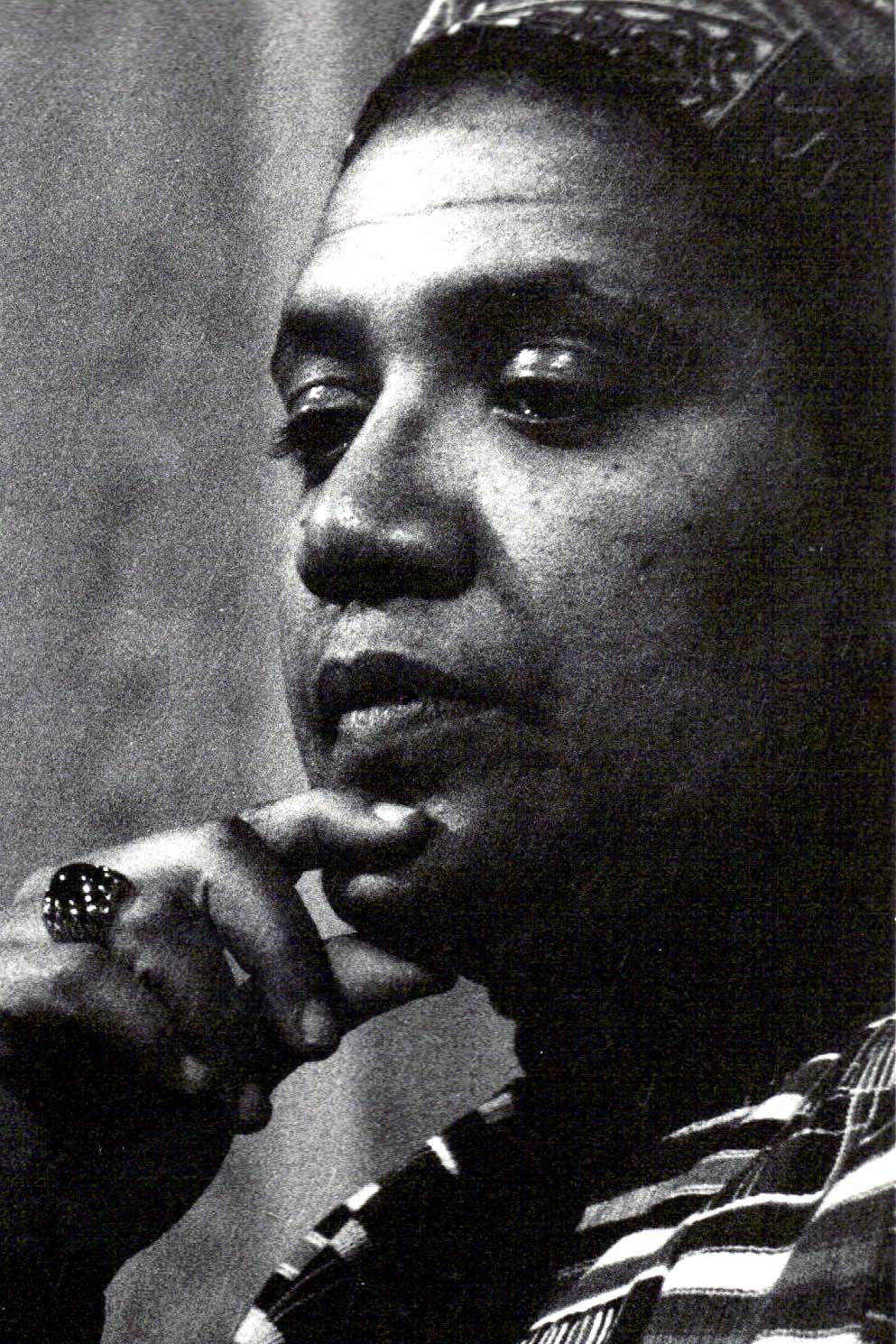
Audre Lorde was the third poet laureate of New York.

== List of poets laureate ==
- Stanley Kunitz (1987–1989)
- Robert Creeley (1989–1991)
- Audre Lorde (1991–1993)
- Richard Howard (1993–1995)
- Jane Cooper (1995–1997)
- Sharon Olds (1998–2000)
- John Ashbery (2001–2003)
- Billy Collins (2004–2006)
- Jean Valentine (2008–2010)
- Marie Howe (2012–2014)
- Yusef Komunyakaa (2015–2017)
- Alicia Ostriker (2018–2021)
- Willie Perdomo (2021–2023)
- Patricia Spears Jones (2023–2025)
- Kimiko Hahn (2025–present)

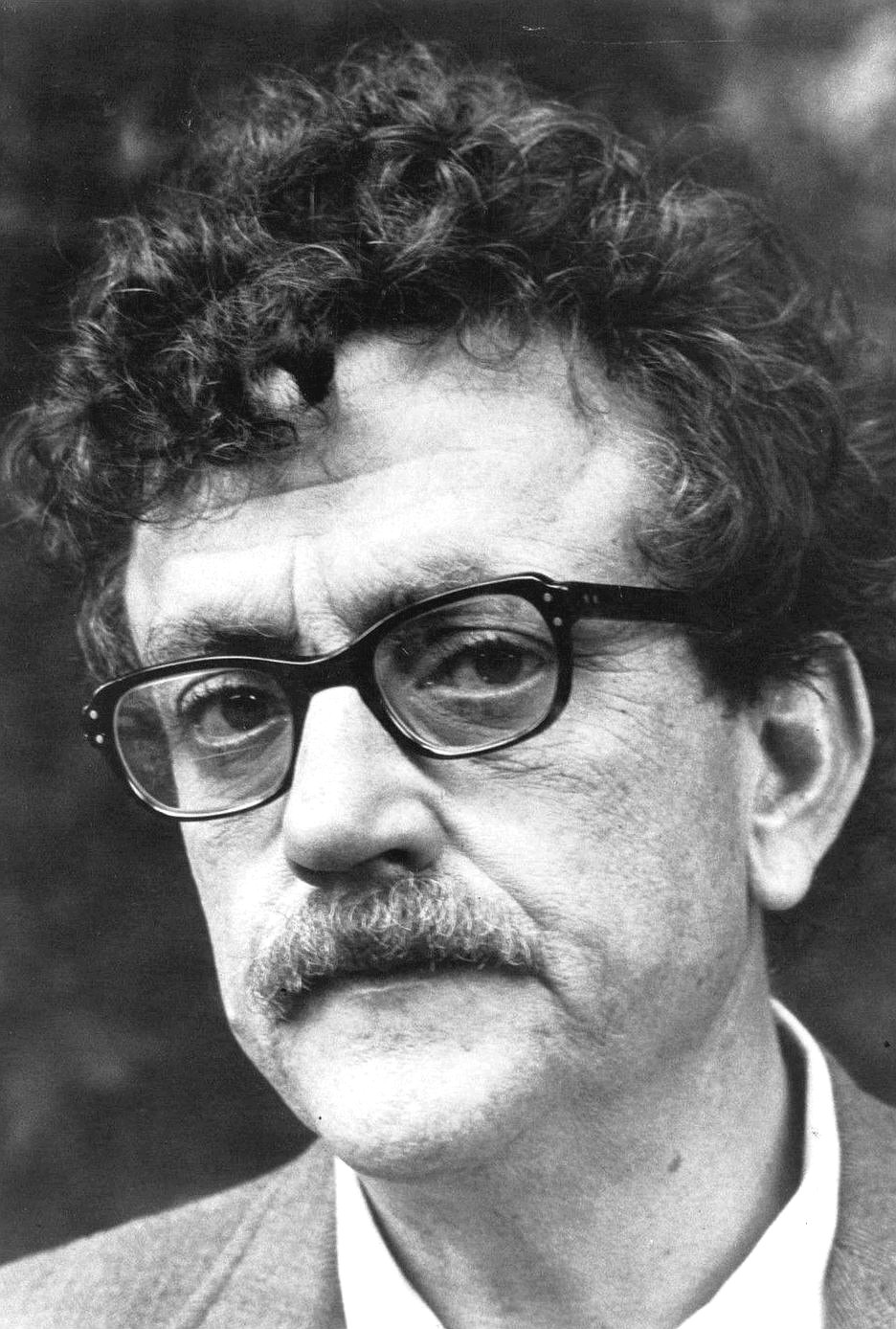
Kurt Vonnegut was named state author in 2001.

== List of state authors ==
- Grace Paley (1986–1988)
- E. L. Doctorow (1989–1991)
- Norman Mailer (1991–1993)
- William Gaddis (1993–1995)
- Peter Matthiessen (1995–1997)
- James Salter (1998–2000)
- Kurt Vonnegut (2001–2003)
- Russell Banks (2004–2008)
- Mary Gordon (2008–2010)
- Alison Lurie (2012–2014)
- Edmund White (2014–2016)
- Colson Whitehead (2018–2021)
- Ayad Akhtar (2021–2023)
- Jacqueline Woodson (2023–2025)
- Min Jin Lee (2025–present)
- References
