= What I Wrote =

What I Wrote is a TV series broadcast on ABCTV 1 in Australia.

The series focuses on Australian writers talking about their work. They are interviewed and presented by Dr. Tess Brady.

The first series broadcast on ABC TV 1 in February 2010. The second series broadcast from mid October 2010.

== Series 1 episodes ==
Joanna Murray-Smith discusses the power of words in Nightfall

Joanna Murray-Smith explores love, identity and belonging in Honour

Louis Nowra talks about shedding the misconceptions of childhood in Radiance

Louis Nowra discusses art and claims it should not be relevant in Cosi

Hannie Rayson explores family and identity in Inheritance

Hannie Rayson discusses the relationship between art and personal story in Hotel Sorrento

David Williamson shows how sport reflects society in The Club

David Williamson discusses failed dreams in Don's Party

Andrew Bovell explores the intersections of story in the Lantana series

Andrew Bovell discusses recurring patterns of family and global histories in When the Rain Stops Falling

== Series 2 episodes ==
Jack Hibberd talks about bringing down the fourth wall in Dimboola

Jack Hibberd discusses the existential clown in A Stretch of the Imagination

Debra Oswald explores the ugly ducking story underlying Dags

Debra Oswald talks about the relationship of a father and daughter in Mr Bailey's Minder

Matt Cameron discusses the dark side of suburbia in Ruby Moon

Matt Cameron explores the nature of indifference in Tear from a Glass Eye

Katherine Thomson talks about our relationship to land and history in Wonderlands

Katherine Thomson discusses the end of old style unionism in Harbour

Ray Lawler talks about writing Australia onto the stage in Summer of the Seventeenth Doll

Ray Lawler talks about becoming a playwright in Finding a Way
