= Morgan Entrekin =

American publishing executive

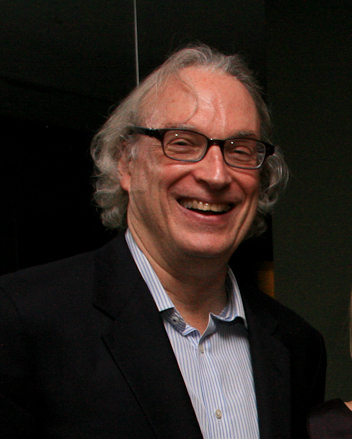
Morgan Entrekin in 2012

Morgan Entrekin is the CEO and publisher of Grove/Atlantic Inc. Books in New York City. He is one of six owners of the publishing company.

He is from Nashville, Tennessee.

== Timeline ==
Entrekin is a graduate of Montgomery Bell Academy, Stanford University and the Radcliffe Publishing Course. He began his career at Delacorte Press. In 1982 he moved to Simon & Schuster. In 1984, he started his own imprint at Atlantic Monthly Press. In 1993 he merged this company with Grove Press to create Grove/Atlantic Inc. In 2015, he launched Literary Hub with editor Terry McDonell and publisher Andy Hunter. He was the recipient of the 2017 Maxwell E. Perkins Award for Distinguished Achievement in the Field of Fiction.

== Films ==
- 2017 - Voyeur
