= Philip Auerswald =

American author and economist

Philip E. Auerswald
- Born: Washington, D.C.
- Education: Yale University (B.A.); University of Washington (PhD, Economics)
- Occupations: Author, Professor
- Website: auerswald.org

Philip E. Auerswald is an American author, economist, and cofounder and coeditor of Innovations (journal). His most recent book, The Code Economy: A Forty-Thousand-Year History, explains how code has been a key driver of human development.

== Career ==
Auerswald is a professor of public policy at George Mason University Schar School of Policy and Government and the founding co-editor of Innovations (journal), a quarterly journal published by MIT Press about entrepreneurial solutions to global challenges. Auerswald's research work focuses on entrepreneurship, technology, and innovation, both in the US and globally.

Prior to his work with Innovations, Auerswald edited the Foreign Policy Bulletin from 1994 to 2005. With his father, Auerswald cofounded the Foreign Policy Bulletin as the successor publication to The Department of State Bulletin. The Foreign Policy Bulletin was in publication from 1991 to 2012 and resulted in documentary compilations relating to Iraq and Kosovo.

Auerswald is the Founding Board Chair for The National Center for Entrepreneurship and Innovation. The stated objective of NCEI is to foster entrepreneurship, invention and innovation by all Americans, using the National Mall in Washington DC as a platform. Fellow board members include Vint Cerf, Carly Fiorina, and Dean Kamen. In April 2016, The National Center for Entrepreneurship and Innovation hosted an event at the National Academy of Sciences focused on planning for the 250th Anniversary of the founding of the United States of America.

As of July 2018, Auerswald has served as the Chief Academic Officer of the Hult Prize Foundation. In that capacity, Auerswald provides oversight and direction to all aspects of the Hult Prize Foundation's educational initiatives. With Hult Prize cofounder Ahmad Ashkar, he is responsible for leading the production of the challenge document that serves every year as the guide to the students who participate in the Hult Prize.

He was also the founding executive director of the Global Entrepreneurship Research Network. GERN initiated in October 2013 by the Ewing Marion Kauffman Foundation and Global Entrepreneurship Network (GEN), to address the need for better entrepreneurship research. Auerswald has said that GERN seeks convergence by connecting supporters of entrepreneurship research to enable them to work collaboratively on developing new research methods and to align around similar goals.

From 2010 to 2013 Auerswald was an advisor to the Clinton Global Initiative, focusing on job creation and market-based solutions.

He has authored and co-author of numerous books, reports, and research papers, including The Coming Prosperity: How Entrepreneurs Are Transforming the Global Economy and Seeds of Disaster, which Wall Street Journal called "a vivid profile of men and women who have succeeded under harsh conditions... with a lively writing style, and the analysis is lightened with personal anecdotes and pop-culture references."

In 2015, Auerswald co-authored Depopulation: An Investor's Guide to Value in the Twenty-First Century with Joon Yun. The book discusses the challenges and opportunities investors can anticipate in the coming era of declining global population.

Auerswald was a student at the 1993 Complex Systems Summer School at the Santa Fe Institute, where he worked with Stuart Kauffman on an application of evolutionary biology to economics. He is a recipient of a National Science Foundation grant for continued work in this area.

== Innovations: Technology, Governance, Globalization ==
In 2006, Auerswald and Iqbal Z. Quadir co-founded Innovations (journal), an academic journal that focuses on entrepreneurial solutions to global challenges. It is published quarterly by the MIT Press. he journal features cases authored by exceptional innovators; commentary and research from leading academics; and essays from globally recognized executives and political leaders. It is jointly hosted at George Mason University's Schar School of Policy and Government, Harvard University's Belfer Center for Science and International Affairs, and MIT's Legatum Center for Development and Entrepreneurship. Working with the Schwab Foundation for Social Entrepreneurship, Innovations produced special editions for the 2008 annual meeting of the World Economic Forum and the 2008 World Economic Forum on the Middle East (in Arabic and English). The journal has also produced special issues in partnership with the Rockefeller Foundation, the Gates Foundation, SOCAP, GSMA, the Lemelson Foundation, and other nonprofit and philanthropic organizations.

In 2016 the journal expanded into Policy Design Lab, a consulting company dedicated to prompting the creation and implementation of evidence-based policies that advance society. The same year Auerswald co-led the release of Innovations Online, with Sharon Benzoni.

== Digital Land Records and Entrepreneurship ==
In 2013, Auerswald co-authored "Integrating Technology and Institutional Change" with Jenny Stefanotti. The paper focuses on the design and deployment of digital property rights. The essay argues that the current technological environment provide opportunities to improve economies in developing countries by digitizing property records.

In 2017 Auerswald cofounded Zilla Global LLC, a company focused on using the digitization of land records as a way to create jobs in the developing world. He co-leads Zilla with Dr. Gitanjali Swamy. The stated purpose of the company is to create employment opportunities at a large-scale with digital land records as the base.

== Books and publications ==
Title	Year	ISBN
The Code Economy: A Forty-Thousand Year History	2017	ISBN 978-0190226763
Depopulation: An Investor's Guide to Value in the Twenty-First Century	2015	ISBN 1507771746
The Coming Prosperity: How Entrepreneurs Are Transforming the Global Economy	2012	ISBN 978-0199795178
Iraq, 1990-2006 3 Volume Set: A Diplomatic History Through Documents	2009	ISBN 978-0521767767
Seeds of Disaster, Roots of Response: How Private Action Can Reduce Public Vulnerability	2006	ISBN 978-0521857963
The Kosovo Conflict:A Diplomatic History Through Documents	2009	ISBN 9041188509
Taking Technical Risks: How Innovators, Managers, and Investors Manage Risk in High-Tech Innovations	2000	ISBN 0262524198

== Biography ==
Philip Auerswald was born in Washington, D.C. His father worked for the U.S. State Department and his mother taught philosophy at a French school. Auerswald attended Sidwell Friends School for junior high and high school. Afterwards, he attended Yale University to receive an undergraduate degree in political science. After earning a PhD in economics from the University of Washington, Auerswald lectured at the John F. Kennedy School of Government, where he was also assistant director of the Science, Technology and Public Policy Program, working for John Holdren. He presently teaches at George Mason University where he is a professor at the Schar School of Policy and Government.

== See also ==
- Innovations (journal)
