= Marie Howe =

American poet (born 1950)

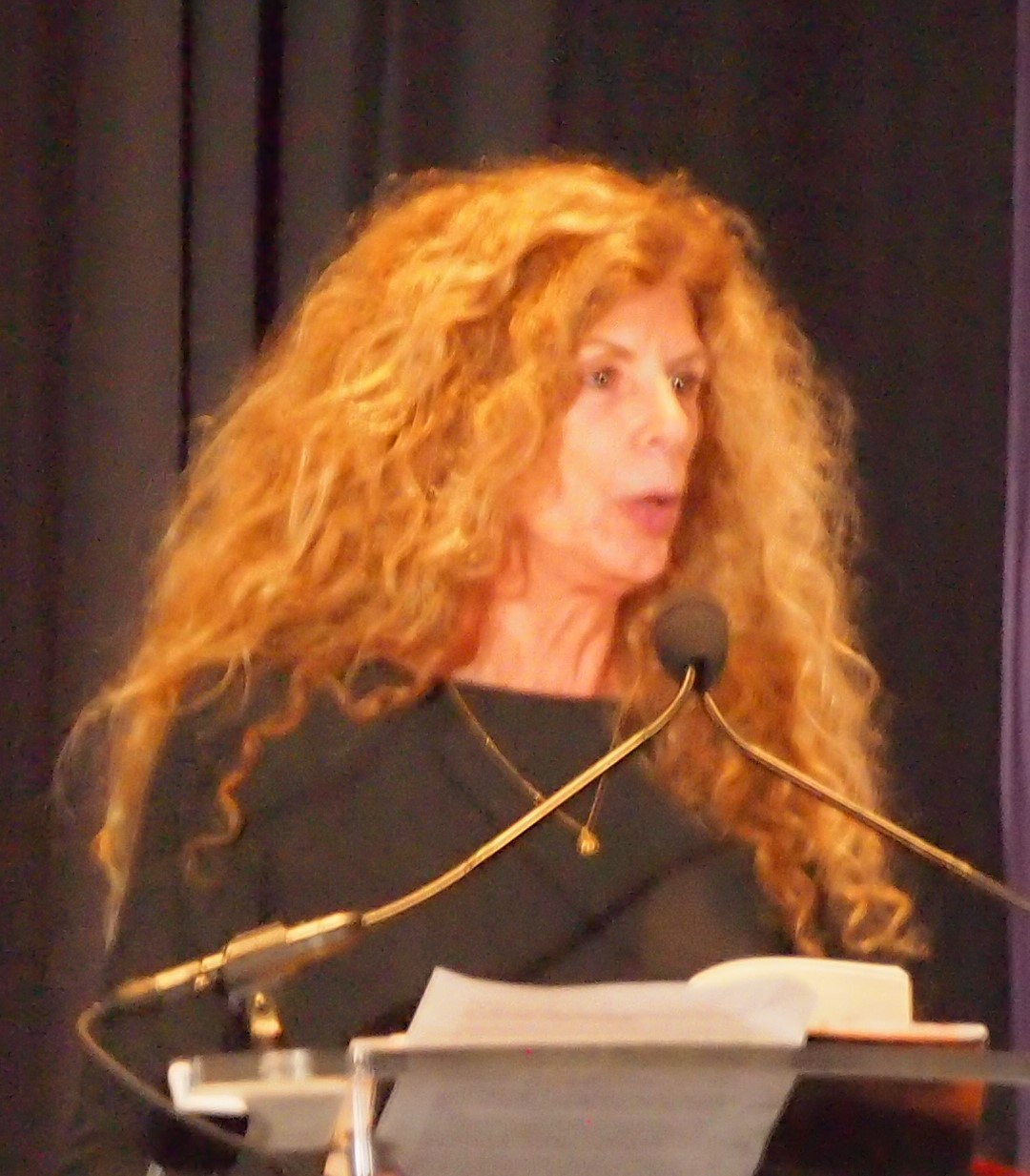
- Born: October 18, 1950 (age 75); Rochester, New York, U.S.
- Education: University of Windsor (B.A.); Columbia University (M.F.A)
- Occupations: Poet, Professor
- Children: Grace Inan Howe
- Writing career
- Genre: Poetry
- Notable works: The Good Thief (1988); What the Living Do (1998); The Kingdom of Ordinary Time (2008); Magdalene (2017); New and Selected Poems (2024); What the Earth Seemed to Say (2024)
- Notable awards: Pulitzer Prize for Poetry (2025); Guggenheim Fellowship (1998); National Poetry Series (1987)

Poet Laureate of New York
- In office 2012–2014
- Preceded by: Jean Valentine
- Succeeded by: Yusef Komunyakaa
- Website: www.mariehowe.com

Marie Howe (born 1950) is an American poet. Howe served as New York Poet Laureate from 2012–2016. She is currently a Chancellor of the Academy of American Poets and Poet-in-Residence at The Cathedral of St John the Divine. Throughout her career, she has received fellowships from the John Simon Guggenheim Memorial Foundation, the National Endowment for the Arts, the Harvard Radcliffe Institute, and The Fine Arts Work Center in Provincetown.

In 1987, her debut collection The Good Thief was selected by Margaret Atwood for the National Poetry Series. Her subsequent collections include What the Living Do (1997), The Kingdom of Ordinary Time (2008), and Magdalene (2017), which was Longlisted for the National Book Award for Poetry. In 2024 W. W. Norton & Company published her New & Selected Poems, while Bloodaxe Books published its UK companion, What the Earth Seemed to Say, to critical acclaim.

== Early life ==
Howe was born in Rochester, New York. In a 2013 interview with On Being, Howe would note that

I grew up in the Catholic religion, in a large Irish-Catholic family. I was the oldest daughter out of nine children. All of my sisters had nine or ten kids, and all of my father’s sisters and brothers also had nine or ten kids, so I had literally over a hundred first cousins. It was a tribal childhood, and the Catholicism was at the center of it.

In the 1960s, Howe enrolled in the Academy of the Sacred Heart, a socially progressive, parochial all-girls school, where the nuns centered what Theology has to do with “social justice, service, questioning, and authority.” Howe would later observe that “it was there that I began to appreciate that spirituality could be rigorous, imaginative and an essential part of living in the physical world.” During this time she would spend “hours lying in the bathtub” reading from The Lives of Saints, which would become her first example of “women who were the subjects of their own lives, not objects.”

Howe would later attend the University of Windsor, a historically Roman Catholic university in Ontario, Canada, where she earned a BA degree in English. She would subsequently relocate to Groton, Massachusetts, to pursue a career as a journalist, and later a high school English teacher. In 1980, she received a fellowship to the Summer Humanities Institute at Dartmouth College, where she had applied to study Philosophy, but ended up enrolling in a creative writing workshop.

In 1981, Howe relocated to Concord, Massachusetts. When reflecting on this time later in life, Howe would note that

Every day I would walk to the old North Bridge and visit Thoreau’s Grave and Emerson's grave. I was so lonely, lonely, lonely. And I learned how to sit still. And how to sit in a chair and bang on a typewriter. You know. You have to learn how to sit still. I didn’t know how to do that. It took me a long time. I applied to graduate schools and I went. It was a miracle.

The following year, she moved to New York City to pursue an MFA in Creative Writing at Columbia University School of the Arts.

== Career ==
Howe worked briefly as a newspaper reporter in Rochester and as a high-school English teacher in Massachusetts. She did not devote serious attention to writing poetry until she turned 30. At the suggestion of an instructor in a writers' workshop, Howe applied to and was accepted at Columbia University where she studied with Stanley Kunitz and received her M.F.A. in 1983.

She has taught writing at Tufts University and Warren Wilson College. She is presently on the writing faculties at Columbia University, Sarah Lawrence College, and New York University.

Her first book, The Good Thief, was selected by Margaret Atwood as the winner of the 1987 Open Competition of the National Poetry Series. In 1998, she published her best-known book of poems, What the Living Do; the title poem in the collection is a haunting lament for her brother with the plain-spoken last line: "I am living, I remember you."

Howe's brother John died of an AIDS-related illness in 1989. "John’s living and dying changed my aesthetic entirely," she has said. In 1995, Howe co-edited, with Michael Klein, a collection of essays, letters, and stories entitled In the Company of My Solitude: American Writing from the AIDS Pandemic.

Her poems have appeared in literary journals and magazines including The New Yorker, The Atlantic, Poetry, Agni, Ploughshares, and Harvard Review. Her honors include National Endowment for the Arts and Guggenheim fellowships.

In January 2018, Howe was elected a Chancellor of the Academy of American Poets.

== Literary themes and style ==
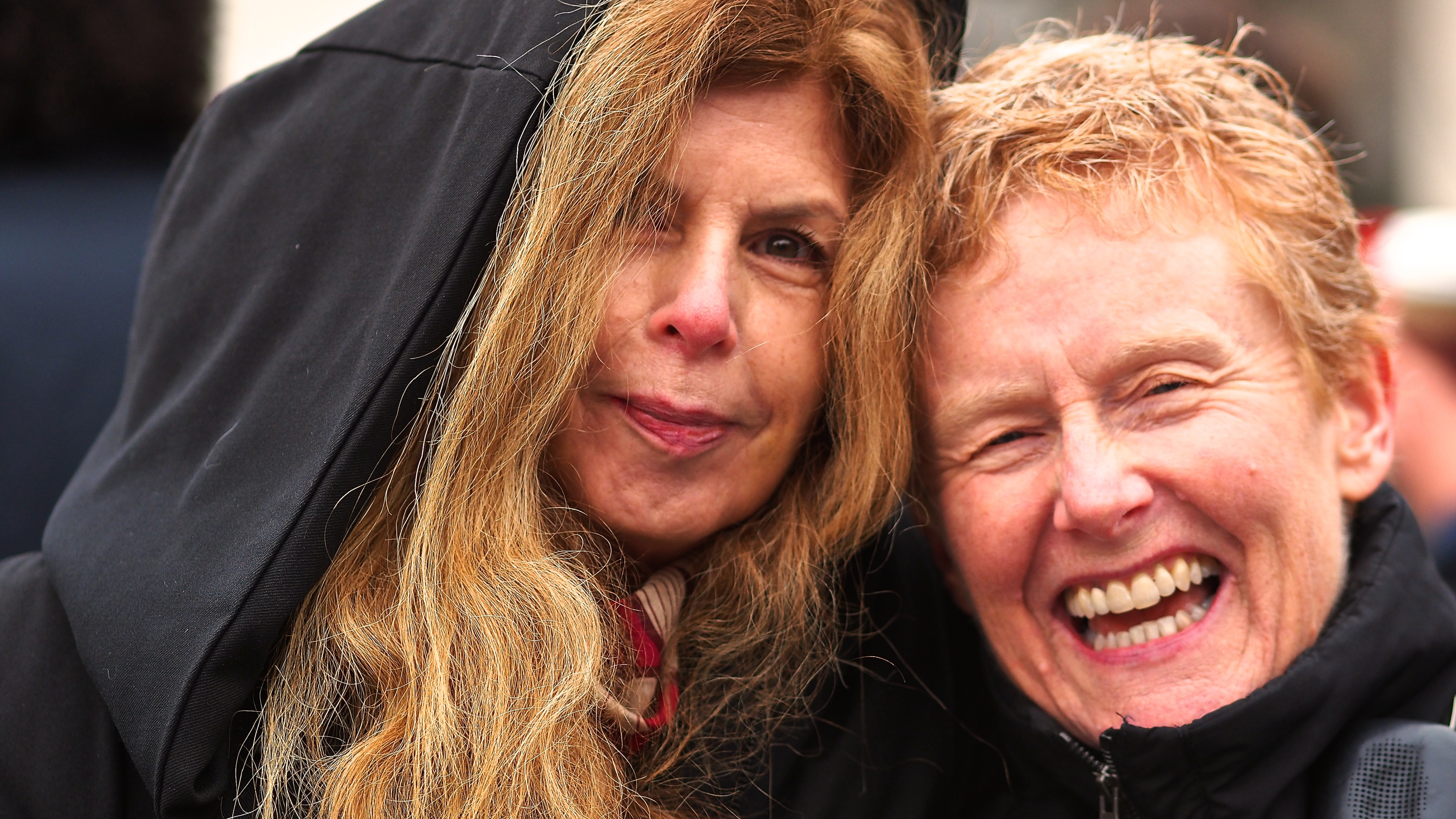
Howe at New York City Poetry Rally 2014, with Suzanne Gardinier

Marie Howe is praised for her poetry which captures the metaphysical and spiritual dimensions of everyday life. Her work explores the nature of the soul and the self through literary themes of life, death, love, pain, hope, despair, sin, virtue, solitude, community, impermanence, and the eternal. Despite the strong themes in her writing, Howe subtly expresses these messages through the explanation of daily tasks and regular lifestyles in most of her poems.

Her first collection, The Good Thief (1988), was made philosophical and reflective with the incorporation of Biblical and mythical allusions. Margaret Atwood, who chose this book for the National Poetry Series, praised Howe’s “poems of obsession that transcend their own dark roots.” Additionally, Stanley Kunitz noted, “Her long, deep-breathing lines address the mysteries of flesh and spirit, in terms accessible only to a woman who is very much of our time and yet still in touch with the sacred.” Such an esteemed review justified the selection of The Good Thief for the Lavan Younger Poets Prize from the American Academy of Poets.

A year after the publication of her first poetry book (1989), Howe’s brother John died from AIDS. According to Howe in an AGNI interview, “John’s living and dying changed my aesthetic completely.” Consequently in 1997, she published a second collection, What the Living Do, as an elegy for John which reflected a new style. Stripped of metaphors, her writing was described as “a transparent, accessible documentary of loss” by the Poetry Foundation.

In 2008, Howe distanced herself from the personal narrative and returned to the spiritual style in The Kingdom of Ordinary Time. This is most representative of Howe’s style now, a balance between the ordinary and unordinary. It is best put by playwright Eve Ensler, who describes her poems as “a guide to living on the brink of the mystical and the mundane.”

== Honors and awards ==
- 1983: Poetry Fellowship, Fine Arts Work Center, Provincetown
- 1987: National Poetry Series
- 1988: The Lavan Younger Poets Prize, Academy of American Poets
- 1992: National Endowment for the Arts Fellowship
- 2001: Radcliffe Fellowship, Harvard University
- 1998: Guggenheim Fellowship
- 2008: Los Angeles Times Book Prize, Finalist
- 2012: New York State Poet Laureate
- 2015: Academy of American Poets Fellowship
- 2017: National Book Award, Longlist
- 2017: Robert Creeley Award
- 2017: The Jerome J. Shestack Prize, The American Poetry Review
- 2018: Academy of American Poets Chancellor
- 2020: Poet in Residence, The Cathedral of St. John the Divine
- 2025: Pulitzer Prize for Poetry, New and Selected Poems. W. W. Norton & Company. 2025. ISBN 9781324117674.

== Published works ==
Poetry Collections

- What the Earth Seemed to Say. Bloodaxe Books. 2024. ISBN 9781780377247.
- New and Selected Poems. W. W. Norton & Company. 2024. ISBN 9781324075035.
- Magdalene. W. W. Norton & Company. 2017. ISBN 9780393285307.
- The Kingdom of Ordinary Time. W. W. Norton & Company. 2008. ISBN 9780393337341.
- What the Living Do. W. W. Norton & Company. 1998. ISBN 9780393318869.
- The Good Thief. Persea Books. 1988. ISBN 9780892551279

Anthologies

- Counting Time Like People Count Stars, (by Luis J. Rodríguezed, ed. by Spencer Reece, Foreword by Marie Howe, Afterword by Richard Blanco, Northwestern University Press, 2017) ISBN 9781882688555
- In the Company of My Solitude: American Writing from the AIDS Pandemic, (ed., with Michael Klein, Persea Books, 1995) ISBN 9780892552085

== Sources ==
- Library of Congress Online Catalog > Marie Howe
