= Grove Atlantic =

American independent publisher

Coordinates: 40.73821°N 73.99944°W

Grove Atlantic, Inc.
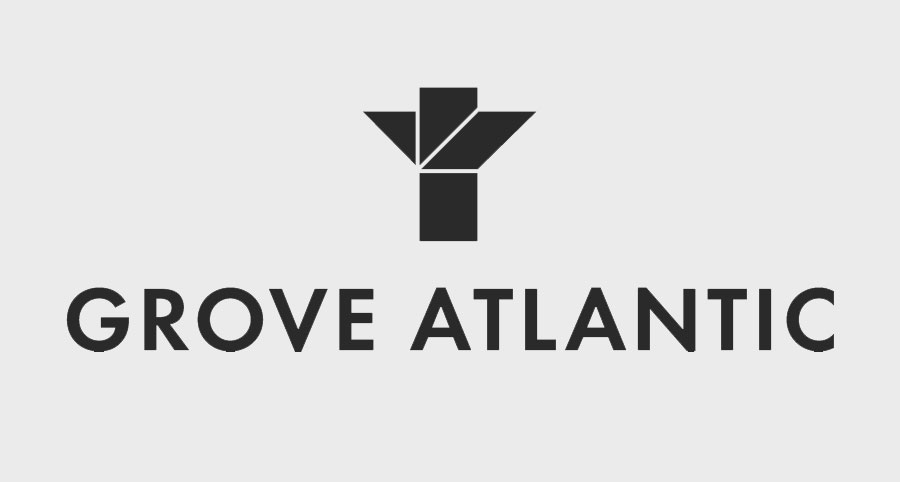
- Founder: Merger of Grove Press and Atlantic Monthly Press
- Country of origin: United States
- Headquarters location: 154 W. 14th Street, New York City, NY 10011
- Distribution: Publishers Group West (US); Atlantic Books (UK)
- Key people: Morgan Entrekin (president and publisher)
- Publication types: Books
- Imprints: Grove Press; Atlantic Monthly Press; The Mysterious Press; Black Cat
- Official website: groveatlantic.com.

Grove Atlantic, Inc. is an American independent publisher, based in New York City. Formerly styled "Grove/Atlantic, Inc.", it was created in 1993 by the merger of Grove Press and Atlantic Monthly Press. As of 2018, Grove Atlantic calls itself "An Independent Literary Publisher Since 1917". That refers to the official date Atlantic Monthly Press was established by the Boston magazine The Atlantic Monthly.

== History and operations ==
The company's imprints – Grove Press, Atlantic Monthly Press, The Mysterious Press, and Black Cat (as of October 2018) – publish literary fiction, nonfiction, poetry, drama and translations. Former imprints include Canongate U.S. and Open City.

In 1990, the imprint Atlantic Monthly Press was publishing 40 new hardcover titles a year, including both fiction and non-fiction.

The company's imprints published the books by the 2006 and 2007 recipients of the Man Booker Prize: The Inheritance of Loss (Hamish Hamilton / Atlantic Monthly Press) by Kiran Desai; and The Gathering (Jonathan Cape / Black Cat) by Anne Enright, respectively.

The company's president and publisher is Morgan Entrekin. In 2015, Entrekin – working with other publishers, booksellers, and literati – introduced Literary Hub, an online website for the literary world.

Since 2010, the British publishing house Atlantic Books has been publishing a selection of books on behalf of Grove/Atlantic, Inc. in the United Kingdom, using the "Grove Press UK" imprint.

== Editors and publishers ==
- Gary Fisketjon, Editorial Director 1986–1990
- Ann Godoff, Editor-in-Chief, promoted in 1990
- Carl Navarre, Publisher
- Joan Bingham was the executive editor of Grove Atlantic for nearly 30 years.

== Notable authors ==
Its authors include:

- Kathy Acker
- Samuel Beckett
- Mark Bowden
- William S. Burroughs
- Frantz Fanon
- Raymond Carver
- Richard Ford,
- Charles Frazier
- Betsy Lerner
- Donna Leon
- Jay McInerney
- Eugène Ionesco
- Jim Harrison
- Henry Miller
- Kenzaburō Ōe
- Harold Pinter
- Kay Ryan
- John Kennedy Toole
- Jeanette Winterson

== See also ==
- List of companies based in New York City
- List of English-language book publishing companies
- List of English-language small presses
