= Jean Valentine =

American poet (1934–2020)

- Born: April 27, 1934; Chicago, Illinois, U.S.
- Died: December 29, 2020 (aged 86); New York City
- Education: Radcliffe College (B.A.); Harvard University (M.A.)
- Occupations: Poet, Professor
- Spouse: James Chace (m. 1957; div. 1968)
- Children: Sarah Chace; Rebecca Chace
- Writing career
- Period: 1965–2020
- Genre: Poetry
- Notable works: The River at Wolf (1992); Door in the Mountain: New and Collected Poems (2004); Little Boat (2007); Break the Glass (2010); Shirt in Heaven (2015)
- Notable awards: Bollingen Prize (2017); Pulitzer Prize (Finalist, 2010); National Book Award (2004); Guggenheim Fellowship (1976); Yale Younger Poets Prize (1965)

Poet Laureate of New York
- In office 2008–2010
- Preceded by: Billy Collins
- Succeeded by: Marie Howe

Jean Valentine (April 27, 1934 – December 29, 2020) was an American poet. Over a six-decade career, Valentine published 14 collections of poetry. She received the 2004 National Book Award for Poetry for Door in the Mountain: New and Collected Poems, 1965–2003, and was a finalist for the 2011 Pulitzer Prize for Poetry for Break the Glass. In celebrating the later, the committee of judges noted, “This is a collection in which small details can accrue great power and a reader is never sure where any poem might lead.”

Throughout her career, Valentine served on the Creative Writing faculty of New York University, Columbia University, and Sarah Lawrence College. Among numerous awards and honors, she was the recipient of a Guggenheim Fellowship, the Bollingen Prize, and the Yale Younger Poets Prize. Additionally, Valentine served as Poet Laureate of New York from 2008 to 2010. Often celebrated for her minimalist poetics, fellow poet Seamus Heaney once described her verse as “rapturous, risky, shy of words but desperately true to them.”

== Biography ==
Valentine was born in Chicago, Illinois, on April 27, 1934. Her father was a Navy man. She received a Bachelor of Arts degree and a Master of Arts degree from Radcliffe College of Harvard University, and lived most of her life in New York City, where she died on December 29, 2020.

Her last book, Shirt In Heaven, was published in 2015. Before that, Break the Glass, published in 2010, was a finalist for the 2011 Pulitzer Prize for Poetry.

Valentine's first book, Dream Barker (Yale University Press, 1965), was chosen in 1964 for the Yale Series of Younger Poets and won the competition the following year. She published poems widely in literary journals and magazines, including The New Yorker, and Harper's Magazine, and The American Poetry Review. Valentine was one of five poets, including Charles Wright, Russell Edson, James Tate and Louise Glück, whose work Lee Upton considered critically in The Muse of Abandonment: Origin, Identity, Mastery in Five American Poets (Bucknell University Press, 1998). She held residencies from Yaddo, the MacDowell Colony, Ucross, and the Lannan foundation, among others.

She taught with the Graduate Writing Program at New York University, at Columbia University, at the 92nd Street Y in Manhattan, and at Sarah Lawrence College. She was a faculty member at the Vermont College of Fine Arts.

She was Distinguished Poet-in-Residence for Drew University's MFA in Poetry & Poetry in Translation.

She was married to the late American historian James Chace from 1957 to 1968, and they are survived by two daughters, Sarah and Rebecca.

Valentine died in Manhattan on December 29, 2020.

== Published works ==
=== Full-length poetry collections ===
- Shirt in Heaven (2015, Copper Canyon Press)
- Break the Glass (2010, Copper Canyon Press)
- Little Boat (2007, Wesleyan University Press)
- Door in the Mountain: New and Collected Poems, 1965–2003 (2004, Wesleyan University Press) – winner of the National Book Award
- The Cradle of the Real Life (2000, Wesleyan University Press)
- Growing Darkness, Growing Light (1997, Carnegie Mellon University Press)
- The Under Voice: Selected Poems (1995, Salmon Publishing)
- The River at Wolf (1992, Alice James Books)
- Night Lake (1992, Press of Appletree Alley: limited edition of 150, hand-bound, illustrated by Linda Plotkin.)
- Home Deep Blue: New and Selected Poems (1989, Alice James Books)
- The Messenger (1979, Farrar, Straus & Giroux)
- Ordinary Things (1974, Farrar, Straus & Giroux)
- Pilgrims (1969, Farrar, Straus & Giroux)
- Dream Barker, and Other Poems (1965, Yale University Press)

=== Anthology publications ===
- Leaving New York: Writers Look Back (Hungry Mind Press, 1995)

=== Anthologies edited ===
- The Lighthouse Keeper: Essays on the Poetry of Eleanor Ross Taylor (Hobart & William Smith, 2001).

== Awards and honors ==
- 2004 National Book Award for Poetry (for Door in the Mountain: New and Collected Poems, 1965–2003)
- 1999 Shelley Memorial Award
- 1991 Maurice English Poetry Award
- 1988 Beatrice Hawley Award (for Home Deep Blue: New and Selected Poems)
- 1976 Guggenheim Fellowship
- 1972 National Endowment for the Arts – Literature Fellowship in Poetry
- 1965 Yale Series of Younger Poets
