= Christian Barry =

American philosopher

- Awards: Outstanding Researcher Award (ARC), Global Ethics Fellow (Carnegie Council), Leverhulme Visiting Fellowship

Education
- Education: Columbia University
- Thesis: The Contribution Principle: Its Meaning and Significance for Allocating Responsibility to Address Acute Deprivation (2005)

Philosophical work
- Era: 21st-century philosophy
- Region: Western philosophy
- School: Analytic
- Institutions: Australian National University
- Main interests: political philosophy, moral philosophy
- Website: http://christianbarry.net

Christian Barry FAHA is an American philosopher and Professor of Philosophy at the Australian National University. He is a co-editor of the Journal of Political Philosophy and a former head of the School of Philosophy in the Research School of the Social Sciences at the ANU. Barry is known for his research on international justice. Christian was a program officer at the Carnegie Council for Ethics in International Affairs before joining the ANU and is the Ethics Matters podcast co-presenter. Barry was elected a Fellow of the Australian Academy of the Humanities in 2019.

== Books ==
- Responding to Global Poverty: Harm, Responsibility and Agency, (co-authored with Gerhard Øverland) Cambridge University Press, 2016
- International Trade and Labour Standards: A Proposal for Linkage, (co-authored with Sanjay Reddy) Columbia University Press, 2008
- Ethics for Consumers, Oxford University Press, forthcoming
