= Literary Hub =

Daily literary website

- Website type: culture, interviews, literature
- Available in: English
- Headquarters: New York City, United States
- Owner: Grove Atlantic
- Creators: Morgan Entrekin, Terry McDonell
- Editor: Jonny Diamond
- Key people: Andy Hunter
- Website: lithub.com
- Launched: 2015; 11 years ago

Literary Hub or LitHub is a daily literary website that was launched in 2015 by Grove Atlantic president and publisher Morgan Entrekin, American Society of Magazine Editors Hall of Fame editor Terry McDonell, and Electric Literature founder Andy Hunter.

== Content ==
Focused on literary fiction and nonfiction, Literary Hub publishes personal and critical essays, interviews, and book excerpts from over 100 partners, including independent presses (New Directions Publishing, Graywolf Press), large publishers (Simon & Schuster, Alfred A. Knopf), bookstores (Book People, Politics and Prose), non-profits (PEN America), and literary magazines (The Paris Review, n+1). The mission of Literary Hub is to be the "site readers can rely on for smart, engaged, entertaining writing about all things books." The website has been featured in The Washington Post, The Guardian, and Poets & Writers.

In 2019, Literary Hub launched their new blog, The Hub, alongside LitHub Radio, a "network of bookish podcasts featuring some established favorites of the genre along with a new show or two". They also maintain a website for crime, mystery and thriller literature called CrimeReads.

On October 22, 2019, Literary Hub announced a partnership with The Podglomerate, launching Storybound, a new podcast created and hosted by Jude Brewer, exploring "everything from family life to friendship, relationships to histories, and how everything in life can be impacted by the power of a good story."

== Book Marks ==
Book Marks
- Website type: Books review aggregator
- Founder: Literary Hub
- Website: bookmarks.reviews
- Commercial: Yes
- Launched: 2016; 10 years ago

Book Marks is an American review-aggregation website for books, launched by Literary Hub in June 2016. The service aggregates reviews from approximately 70 sources, including newspapers, magazines, and websites, and averages them into a score: "rave", "positive", "mixed", or "pan".

== CrimeReads ==
CrimeReads is a daily website dedicated to crime, mystery, and thrillers. It launched in 2018 as a channel of Literary Hub, with Dwyer Murphy and Molly Odintz as editors.

CrimeReads publishes essays, lists, and other pieces about literature, film, television, radio/podcasts, and theater, as well as personal essays and original true crime research.

The website is and has been advised by crime writers and journalists, including Megan Abbott, Lee Child, Lyndsay Faye, Meg Gardiner, Alison Gaylin, Rachel Howzell Hall, Carl Hiaasen, Sulari Gentill, Joe Ide, Craig Johnson, Ausma Zehanat Khan, Laura Lippman, Attica Locke, Val McDermid, Kyle Mills, Walter Mosley, Lori Rader-Day, Ruth Ware, Sarah Weinman, and Daniel Woodrell. Olivia Rutigliano joined the site as a staff writer in 2020 and became the site's third editor in 2021.

== Political alignment ==
In 2024, Literary Hub came under criticism for publishing an open letter denouncing PEN America’s response to the Israel-Hamas war. The letter, signed by authors such as Naomi Klein and Michelle Alexander, accused PEN of failing to support Palestinian writers. Former New York Times Book Review editor Pamela Paul described the site as “the de facto clearinghouse for pro-Palestinian literary-world sentiment,” in her op-ed Free Speech, PEN America. Publishers Weekly reported that Literary Hub editors responded with humor, joking about printing tote bags with the “clearinghouse” label.
