= James Chace =

American historian (1931–2004)

James Clarke Chace (October 16, 1931 – October 8, 2004) was an American historian, writing on American diplomacy and statecraft. His books include the critically acclaimed Acheson: The Secretary of State Who Created the American World (1998), the definitive biography of former Secretary of State Dean Acheson. In a debate during the 2000 presidential primary, George W. Bush referred to Chace's Acheson as one of the books he was reading at the time.

His writings, known for elegant and even literary prose, often influenced American thought in policymaking—his coining of the phrase "the indispensable nation" with Sidney Blumenthal to describe America was widely used when Secretary of State Madeleine Albright began including it in her speeches.

Chace was born and raised in Fall River, Massachusetts. His family, of the New England aristocracy, lost nearly everything during the Great Depression after the collapse of the Fall River cotton-mill economy. This experience he later described in his 1990 memoir What We Had.

Chace graduated from Harvard University with a degree in Classics. He went to France in 1954 to conduct graduate-study research on painter Eugène Delacroix and writer Charles Baudelaire, but soon found his interest drawn to the current intellectual arena of literature and politics, which led to an intense interest in French political writers including Albert Camus and Jean-Paul Sartre. He returned to France later the same year as a soldier and in 1955 and 1956 worked as an Army translator, which involved the translation of French newspapers for the Central Intelligence Agency. While in France he wrote a novel and was witness to the impact of that nation's withdrawal from Vietnam and its problems with a rebellion in colonialized Algeria.

After his return to the United States his interest in foreign policy grew as he served as managing editor for East Europe, a political review of Soviet bloc affairs, from 1959 to 1969, during which time he wrote his book Conflict in the Middle East about the Six-Day War. He also served as the managing editor of the foreign policy journal Interplay (1967–1970) and Foreign Affairs (1970–1983). He became editor of the World Policy Journal in 1993, where he served for 7 years. In 1990, he was appointed Professor of Government at Bard College in Annandale-on-Hudson, in upstate New York. He later helped found and chair Bard's international affairs program, the Bard Globalization and International Affairs Program (BGIA), in New York City. His pieces were frequently printed on newspaper op-ed pages and he contributed to the New York Times Book Review in the 1980s and 1990s.

Chace's work focused on American statesmanship, the interplay of American interests with American values, and the use of American power. He believed that any statesman effectively leading a nation will understand that resources are limited — including blood and political will — and that in protecting the interests of the nation those resources cannot be overtaxed. According to fellow writer and good friend Mark Danner, Chace considered the Vietnam War a classic example of a nation failing to prudently balance interests and resources, and saw the Iraq War as another example.

Chace died from a heart attack in Paris while doing research for a biography of the Marquis de Lafayette, which would have been his tenth book. At the time of his death, Chace resided in New York City and was survived by former wives Jean Valentine and Susan Denvir Chace, daughters Sarah, Rebecca, and Zoe. He was a close friend and mentor of military historian and author Caleb Carr and historian David Fromkin. He had two grand daughters, Rebecca and Pesha. Joan Bingham was a long time companion.

== Publications ==
External videos
- Presentation by Chace on Acheson, September 16, 1998, C-SPAN
- Booknotes interview with Chace on 1912, August 29, 2004, C-SPAN
- Presentation by Chace on 1912, May 12, 2004, C-SPAN

- The Rules of the Game (1960 Doubleday) – a novel
- Conflict in the Middle East (1969 H. W. Wilson Company) – causes and consequences of the 1967 Six-Day War
- A World Elsewhere: the new American foreign policy (1973 Scribner) (ISBN 0-684-13225-7)
- Atlantis Lost: United States-European Relation After the Cold War (James Chace, co-editor with Earl C. Ravenal) (1976 UP) ISBN 0-8147-1361-0
- Solvency, the Price of Survival: An essay on American foreign policy (1981 Random House) ISBN 0-394-50754-1
- Endless War: How We Got Involved in Central America-And What Can Be Done (1984 Vintage Books) (ISBN 0-394-72779-7)
- America Invulnerable: The Quest for Absolute Security from 1812 to Star Wars (1988 Summit) (by James Chace with Caleb Carr) ISBN 0-671-61778-8
- What We Had: A Memoir (1990 Summit Books) ISBN 0-671-69478-2
- The Consequences of the Peace: The New Internationalism and American Foreign Policy (1993 Oxford) ISBN 0-19-508354-7
- Acheson: The Secretary Of State Who Created The American World (1998 Simon & Schuster)
- What If? 2: Eminent Historians Imagine What Might Have Been (2001 Putnam) (by Robert Cowley, James Chace and John Lukacs) ISBN 0-399-14795-0
- 1912: Wilson, Roosevelt, Taft and Debs-The Election that Changed the Country (2004 Simon & Schuster, Inc.) ISBN 0-7432-0394-1
- Booknotes on American Character: people, politics, and conflict in American history (2004 Perseus Press) (contributor) ISBN 1-58648-232-7
