= SOCAP (conference) =

Annual impact investing conference in the United States

SOCAP, originally the Social Capital Markets Conference, is an annual conference on impact investing and social entrepreneurship. The conference was held in San Francisco from 2008 through 2019 and again from 2022 through 2025, with virtual conferences in 2020 and 2021, and is scheduled for Chicago in 2026.

It was founded by a team that included Kevin Doyle Jones, Rosa Lee Harden, and Tim Freundlich, and drew 1,600 attendees by 2012. The conference addresses the use of investment capital to pursue social and environmental objectives, including impact measurement and rating systems and nonprofit and for-profit models for financing social-impact organizations.

Since June 2022, SOCAP has been managed by the Sorenson Impact Institute at the University of Utah.
