= Bruce Weinstein =

American ethicist

- Education: Georgetown University
- Occupation: Writer
- Years active: 1985–present
- Known for: Ethics in Business
- Notable work: What Should I Do: 4 Simple Steps to Making Better Decisions in Everyday Life; Ethical Intelligence.

Bruce Weinstein is an American ethicist who writes about ethics, character, and leadership for Fortune. He also writes for and is on the Society of Corporate Compliance and Ethics (SCCE) editorial board. Much of Weinstein's work focuses on business leaders, members of professional trade associations, and students who appreciate ethics' role in everyday life. This work often is through interactive keynote addresses to corporations, universities, and other organizations.

== Early publications ==
Weinstein published his first book in 1985 at 25 while a graduate student at Georgetown University. Ethics in the Hospital Setting contains the papers presented at the first state conference devoted to the issue of what was then called hospital ethics committees, now known as institutional ethics committees. Weinstein is credited as the editor of the volume. Portions of Weinstein's doctoral dissertation, The Possibility of Ethical Expertise (Georgetown University, 1989), were edited and published as the articles What is an Expert? and The Possibility of Ethical Expertise.

Weinstein's second book as editor, Dental Ethics, is a collection of articles co-authored by ethicists and dentists. His third book as editor, Ethical Issues in Pharmacy, contains essays co-authored by ethicists and pharmacists.

== Later publications ==
=== What Should I Do: 4 Simple Steps to Making Better Decisions in Everyday Life. ===
His first book in this project was, "What Should I Do: 4 Simple Steps to Making Better Decisions in Everyday Life." He applied the four-step protocol used by institutional ethics committees to ethical issues that people outside of health care face. This protocol is:

1. Get the facts.
2. Identify the values at stake.
3. Find the options available to you.
4. Test the options and choose the best one, based steps 1 and 2.

The book was a Finalist for the Books for a Better Life Award.

=== Life Principles: Feeling Good by Doing Good ===
Weinstein's next book was published in 2005 by Emmis Books, a division of Emmis Communications. "Life Principles: Feeling Good by Doing Good," was an application of Tom Beauchamp and James Childress's "Principles of Biomedical Ethics." The basis of the Beauchamp/Childress work is principlism, an ethical framework that uses principles as the foundation for ethical decision making. The four principles that form the core of the Beauchamp/Childress work are:

1. Respect for autonomy
2. Nonmaleficence
3. Beneficence (ethics)
4. Justice

Weinstein's work simplifies the principles, so that, for example, the principle of nonmaleficence becomes "do no harm", and the principle of beneficence becomes "make things better." Weinstein also applies the principles to areas beyond health care and biomedical research.

=== Is It Still Cheating If I Don't Get Caught? ===
The follow-up to "Life Principles" was a book for 10-14-year-olds entitled, "Is It Still Cheating If I Don't Get Caught?" Published in 2009 by Roaring Brook Press (a division of Macmillan), The book is an application of "Life Principles" to the issues that young adults face with teachers, fellow students, parents, and friends. It received the strongest reviews in Weinstein's career up to that point.

=== Ethical Intelligence: Five Principles for Untangling Your Toughest Problems at Work and Beyond. ===
In 2011, New World Library published Weinstein's "Ethical Intelligence: Five Principles for Untangling Your Toughest Problems at Work and Beyond." The book expanded much of the work Weinstein had done in his columns for Bloomberg Businessweek on such topics as the outsourcing of customer service, the ethics of taking vacations, and how to give and receive criticism. In 2012, ForeWord magazine selected "Ethical Intelligence" as a Silver Winner in its annual Book of the Year Awards in the self-help category.

=== Newspapers ===
Weinstein's letter to The New York Times calling for honesty in politics was chosen as the basis for its weekly Invitation to a Dialogue feature. The letter was originally published on July 7, 2012, after which readers were invited to submit responses. The letter was then republished on August 11, along with several reader responses and a rejoinder from Weinstein. The basis for the letter was Warren Beatty's 1998 film, Bulworth, a satire predicated on the idea that a politician telling the truth would be the stuff of comedy.

== Books ==
As Editor

- "Ethics in the Hospital Setting" (West Virginia University Press, 1985) ISBN 978-0-937058-23-7
- Dental Ethics (Lea & Febiger, 1993) ISBN 978-0-8121-1444-7
- Ethical Issues in Pharmacy (Applied Therapeutics, 1998), ISBN 978-0-915486-25-0

As Author

- "What Should I Do? 4 Simple Steps to Making Better Decisions in Everyday Life" (Perigee/Penguin, 2000) ISBN 978-0-399-52628-2
- "Life Principles: Feeling Good by Doing Good" (Emmis Books, 2005) ISBN 978-1-57860-216-2
- "Is It Still Cheating If I Don't Get Caught?" (Roaring Brook, 2009) ISBN 978-1-59643-306-9
- "Ethical Intelligence: Five Principles for Solving Your Toughest Problems at Work and Beyond" (New World Library, 2011), ISBN 978-1-60868-054-2
- "The Good Ones: Ten Crucial Qualities of High-Character Employees" (New World Library, Oct 2015), ISBN 978-1608682744

== Media appearances as ethics analyst ==
- Weinstein has offered ethical analyses on CNN's The Situation Room with Wolf Blitzer (on such issues as the Harvard cheating scandal of 2012)
- Anderson Cooper 360 (debating with David Gergen about the ethics of publishing kiss-and-tell books in politics)
- Issue #1 (an ethics quiz he developed)
- NBC's Today (the ethics of going to work sick)
- ABC's Good Morning America (the ethics of tipping and regifting)
- ABC News Now (ethical dilemmas in the workplace)
- WNBC's Today in New York (five principles for making ethical decisions)
- CNBC's "Surviving the Market" (scandals in business)
- WNYC's Leonard Lopate Show (the ethics of apologies)
- FOX News Channel's O'Reilly Factor (the ethics of producing and watching reality television shows)
- Weinstein promotes himself as "The Ethics Guy".
