= Ethics Matters =

- Genre: Philosophy
- Directed by: Catherine Gough-Brady
- Presented by: Dan Halliday, Christian Barry
- Country of origin: Australia
- Original language: English

Production
- Producer: Snodger Media

Original release
- Network: ABC

The Ethics Matters is a TV series on applied ethics and political philosophy, aired on ABC television in Australia. All episodes are also available online. The series was awarded the Media Prize of the Australasian Association of Philosophy in 2018.

== Production ==
- Presenter: Dan Halliday
- Podcast Co-Presenter: Christian Barry
- Director: Catherine Gough-Brady
- Essayist: Brigid Evans
- Producer: Snodger Media
