= Society of Consumer Affairs Professionals in Business =

Trade organization

Coordinates: 37°48′41.6″N 77°22′41.2″W

- Formation: 1973; 53 years ago
- Headquarters: Virginia, United States
- Region served: USA and Canada
- Website: http://www.socap.org

The "Society of Consumer Affairs Professionals in Business", also known as SOCAP International, is a trade organization which represents the profession of customer care across all industries. It was founded in 1973.

SOCAP "Society of Consumer Affairs Professionals") is a non-profit trade association, governed by a board of directors and a set of bylaws. SOCAP exists to provide members with a resource for industry education and networking among colleagues.

SOCAP conducts two annual symposiums featuring nationally known speakers and authors, virtual and in-person community meetings, educational workshops and other member exchanges.

Timely Topics is a virtual monthly discussion on the latest issues. Tech Tuesday is a virtual technology expo where technology partners can demonstrate their products. Business Partner Spotlights are a forum for service partners to demonstrate their expertise. The Industry Communities for Auto, Retail, Consumer Packaged Goods, and Healthcare provide forums for members to engage in learning and discussions focused on the unique issues and best practices within their respective industries. Group bulletin boards enable quick and direct communication between members. Four Regional Communities offer virtual and in-person events, providing members with local networking opportunities and education from expert speakers.

A business partner directory is now available to connect members with technology and service partners in the customer care industry. Marie Shubin serves as the current CEO of SOCAP, while Jon Cox from the Wellness Pet Company holds the position of chairman of the board.

Source: www.socap.org.
