= Joel H. Rosenthal =

American political scientist

Joel H. Rosenthal (born 1960) is a scholar, teacher, and executive best known for his work in ethics and international affairs. He is currently president of Carnegie Council for Ethics in International Affairs. He lectures frequently at universities and public venues across the United States and around the world.^{[1]}

== Early life ==
Rosenthal studied history at Harvard University (B.A., 1982) and American Studies at Yale University (M.A. 1985, PhD 1988).

As a scholar and teacher, Rosenthal has focused on ethics in U.S. foreign policy, with special emphasis on issues of war and peace, human rights, and pluralism. His first book, Righteous Realists (1991), is a study of Hans Morgenthau, George Kennan, and Reinhold Niebuhr, among other American realists. His edited volume, Ethics & International Affairs: A Reader (Georgetown University Press; 3rd edition, co-edited by Christian Barry), is a compilation of essays from major figures in the field and is widely used in college and university courses.

Rosenthal's recent writing is a series of reflections on the moral dimensions of globalization, including essays on patriotism, the "global ethic," and the role of religion in democratic societies.

== Career ==
Rosenthal is adjunct professor, New York University and chairman of the Bard College Globalization and International Affairs (BGIA) program in New York City. He is also Editor-in-Chief of Carnegie Council's flagship journal Ethics & International Affairs.

During his tenure as president of Carnegie Council, the institution has developed its Carnegie Ethics Studio, producing multimedia programs for television, radio, and web audiences worldwide. The Council has also established its Global Ethics Network of Fellows located in two dozen countries in Asia, Europe, Latin America, North America, and the Middle East.

The Council's national and international outreach is led by television broadcasts on MHz Networks (with access to over 42 million households), C-Span Book TV, and CUNY TV (reaching the entire New York City metro area). The Council's flagship publication, Ethics & International Affairs journal, is published by Cambridge University Press. Its articles have appeared over 1,100 times in hundreds of university syllabi in 28 countries. Rosenthal is 2016 Dorsett Fellow, Dartmouth College and serves on the Advisory Board of the Athens Democracy Forum, New York Times Conferences.

== Awards and honors ==
In 2013, he was awarded an Honorary Degree of Doctor of Science in Social Sciences from the University of Edinburgh. The degree was awarded in recognition of his contribution to the field of international relations and ethics.

From 2010-2015, Rosenthal served as an honorary professor at the University of Copenhagen and in 2008 was appointed senior fellow at the Stockdale Center for Ethical Leadership, U.S. Naval Academy. In 1988, Rosenthal won the John Addison Porter Prize, Yale University, for a work of scholarship presented “in such a literary form as to make the product of general human interest.”

== Personal life ==
He is married to Patricia Barney Rosenthal and has two children.

== Selected Articles & Multimedia ==
- “Ethics 101”
- “Peace: What is it Good For?”
- "Compromises and Rotten Compromises: A Reflection on the Iran Deal"
- “Ethics and War in Homer’s Iliad”

== Publications ==
- “Economic Sanctions,” in International Encyclopedia of Ethics, ed. Hugh LaFollette (Wiley-Blackwell; 1 edition, 2013)
- “Patriotism and Cosmopolitanism,” in Civil Religion, Human Rights and International Relations: Connecting People Across Cultures and Traditions, ed. Helle Porsdam (Massachusetts: Edward Elgar Publishing, 2012).
- Editorial advisor for Encyclopedia of Global Justice, ed. Deen Chatterjee (New York: Springer, 2011).
- Co-editor of Ethics and International Affairs: A Reader, 3rd ed. (Washington, D.C.: Georgetown University Press, 2009).
- Ethics and International Relations (Library of Essays in International Relations Series, Ashgate Publishing, 2009) co-edited with Ethan B. Kapstein.
- Foreword in Ethics of Spying: A Reader for the Intelligence Professional, ed. Jan Goldman (Maryland: The Scarecrow Press, Inc., 2005).
- Political Theory and International Affairs: Hans J. Morgenthau on Aristotle’s The Politics Foreword, (Praeger Publishers, 2004)
- Foreword in Ethics and Statecraft: The Moral Dimension of International Affairs, 2nd ed. (Connecticut: Praeger Publishers, 2004)
- Ethics and the Future of Conflict, co-edited with Albert C. Pierce and Anthony Lang (London: Pearson, 2004).
- “A New Ethical Front,” Foreign Policy, July 2002.
- Foreword in Never Again?: The United States and the Prevention and Punishment of Genocide since the Holocaust, (Maryland: Rowman & Littlefield Publishers, 2001).
- “Cycles of Moral Dialogue,” in Autonomy and Order. A Communitarian Anthology, ed. Edward Lehman (Maryland: Rowman & Littlefield Publishers, 2000).
- “Henry Stimson’s Clue,” World Policy Journal, Fall 1997.
- “Ethics,” in Encyclopedia of U.S. Foreign Relations, ed. Bruce W. Jentleson et al. (New York: Oxford University Press, 1996).
- “Private Convictions and Public Commitments,” World Policy Journal, Summer 1995.
- Righteous Realists (Louisiana: Louisiana State University Press, 1991).
