= Azubuike Ishiekwene =

Nigerian journalist

Azubuike Ishiekwene (also known as Azu from his weekly column, born February 19, 1965) was the former executive director of Punch Nigeria.

== Early life and education ==
Azubuike was born in Port Harcourt, Rivers State. He attended Christ The King Primary School, Ajegunle, Lagos (1972–1978); Gaskiya College, Cardoso, Ijora, Badiya, Lagos (1978/79 - 1983) for School Certificate; Jibril Martins Memorial Grammar School, Iponri, Lagos (1983–1985) for HSC. Ishiekwene attended the University of Lagos (Mass Communication) from 1985 to 1988 receiving his B.Sc. in Mass Communications and from 2003 to 2005, earned his Master's degree in Public Administration and International Affairs from the University of Lagos. He holds a master's degree in Public Administration and International Affairs from University of Lagos and a BSc in Mass Communications.

== Career ==
Azu joined Punch in 1989 (after being an intern in 1986) and has at various times been staff reporter, investigative reporter, features writer, senior features writer, deputy features editor, features editor, and deputy editor of Toplife magazine (a Punch publication). He was also a member of the Punch editorial board, and Editor of Saturday Punch between 1996 and 2001.

He was editor of the company's flagship paper and daily title, The Punch, between 2002 and 2006, when he was appointed executive director, Publications, with direct oversight functions for the company's three titles – Sunday Punch, Saturday Punch and The Punch. He has won many awards, including the Babatunde Jose Prize for journalism 1988, the Dame Award for Informed Commentary 1993, 2001, 2004 and again in 2006; and Editor of the Year, NMMA 2006.

From 2002 to 2006, he was editor of the company's flagship paper and daily title, The Punch. As executive director, he has direct oversight of the company's three titles: Sunday Punch, Saturday Punch and The Punch.

Ishiekwene left Punch in 2010. In early March 2010, Steve Ayorinde, the past editor of Punch, made public allegations that Ishiekwene had forced him to resign his position. Ishiekwene was subsequently replaced on the Panel of Judges for the 2010 CNN MultiChoice African Journalists Awards.

Ishiekwene is the author of The Trial of Nuhu Ribadu: A riveting story of Nigeria's anti-corruption war. As of 2013, Ishiekwene is the chairman of editorial board of Leadership Newspapers based in the Nigerian capital city of Abuja.
