= Genevieve Adams =

American actress, screenwriter, and producer

- Education: Dartmouth College
- Occupations: Actor; Writer; Producer
- Known for: I'm Obsessed with You; Simchas and Sorrows

Genevieve Adams is an American actor, screenwriter, producer and director. She wrote and starred in I'm Obsessed with You (2014) and Simchas and Sorrows (2022). She also produced both films and directed Simchas and Sorrows. As an actor, Adams has appeared in other films and television.

== Early life ==
Genevieve Adams was born and grew up in New York City, New York. At Dartmouth College, Adams became part of the theater scene. She participated in productions of the Dartmouth's Department of Theater, including starring in a production of Eurydice. She also performed improv comedy and joined Casual Thursday, a comedy group that performed in fraternity basements. She graduated in 2011 with a degree in English.

== Career ==
Adams had her first break in film acting when a casting director saw a play she also wrote and produced. Following that, she was cast in Bird People (2014), directed by Pascale Ferran, which premiered at the Cannes film festival. Adams subsequently wrote and starred in I'm Obsessed with You (2014), the film version of her play that began as her honors thesis at Dartmouth. Adams was part of an ensemble cast that included Manish Dayal, Thomas McDonell, Rachel Brosnahan and Jason Ralph. I'm Obsessed with You premiered at the Sonoma International Film Festival.

In 2015, Adams appeared in Jason Bateman's The Family Fang. She also had a role in Touched with Fire, which starred Katie Holmes and Luke Kirby. Adams had roles in How to Be Single (2016), Money Monster (2016), Billy Lynn's Long Halftime Walk (2016), and The Report (2019).

Adams wrote, directed, produced, and starred in Simchas and Sorrows, a dramedy film released in 2022. The film tells the story of an atheist actress, played by Adams, who decides to convert to Judaism to marry her fiancé, played by McDonell. Simchas and Sorrows premiered at the virtual showcase Cinejoy, part of the Cinequest Film & Creativity Festival.

== Filmography ==
Year	Title	Role	Refs.
2014	Bird People	Katlyn	
2014	The Skeleton Twins	Store Manager	
2014	A Walk Among the Tombstones	Waitress	
2014	I'm Obsessed with You	Keri Langdon	
2015	The Family Fang	Florida Cashier	
2015	Touched with Fire	Susan	
2016	How to Be Single	Cashier – Baby Store	
2016	Money Monster	Production Assistant	
2016	Billy Lynn's Long Halftime Walk	Stage Manager	
2019	The Report	Flight Instructor	
2022	Simchas and Sorrows	Agnes	
