= Queer Nightlife Community Center =

Queer nightlife nonprofit

Coordinates: 40.6729°N 73.9012°W

- The exterior of the community center in 2025.
- Founded: 2024
- Location: Brownsville, Brooklyn, New York City
- Website: qncc.org

The Queer Nightlife Community Center (QNCC) is a 501(c)(3) nonprofit based in New York City, New York, dedicated to supporting queer and transgender workers in nightlife. The QNCC was founded in 2024 by party promoter Seva Granik and organizer Michael Falco. It operates out of a 15,000-square-foot, two-story warehouse at 100 Hinsdale Street in Brownsville, Brooklyn.

== History ==
Granik describes having conversations with New York's Office of Nightlife about a nonprofit nightlife space as early as 2021. Early concerns responded to a 2018 study by New York's Office of Nightlife that 80 percent of artists and entertainers faced lack of benefits and low pay as barriers. The idea arose again when Granik met Falco in 2024 and discussed his idea for the organization over dinner. The QNCC was formally established in 2024, with guidance from the initiative NYC Create in Place (NYCIP).

The QNCC launched its public-facing programming with a day-long event called "SLAMBIENT" on October 5, 2025, which was attended by approximately 800 people. It featured DJ sets from Madison Moore, Shaun J. Wright, and more, as well as a series of talks on identity and history in nightlife.

In September 2026, QNCC produced Borna Barzin's "The Perverse" as part of its inaugural Theater Residency program. The play featured Ken Barnett, James Cusati-Moyer, Samuel H. Levine, Hari Nef, and N'yomi Allure Stewart, with music by Lauren Flax.

== Key people ==
The QNCC is led by William "Nova" Suarez (Facilities Lead), Doren Johnson (Community Coordinator), Michael Falco (Executive Director and cofounder), and Seva Granik (Creative Director and cofounder). The organization is guided by two boards: a Board of Directors that oversees governance and a Creative Board whose members act as "ambassadors" for the organization.

=== Board of Directors ===
- Nikki Brown
- Kyle Dacuyan
- Breakfast Garbowksi
- madison moore (Chair)
- Henry Bram
- Ronan Farrow
- Kay Gabriel
- Ari Heckman
- KT Kennedy
- Aaron Lord
- Kareem Nemley
- Alyssa Nitchun
- Río Sofia
- Viva Ruiz
- Christopher Udemezue

=== Creative Board ===
- Nita Aviance
- Gideon Berger
- Telfar Clemens
- Nile Harris
- Jackson Howard
- Juliana Huxtable
- Ladyfag
- Andrew Makadsi
- Ashland Mines
- Hari Nef
- Shamel Pitts
- Desi Santiago
- Perry Straus
- Julio Torres
- J Wortham
- Jordan Tannahill
