= Jason Ralph =

American film and stage actor (born 1986)

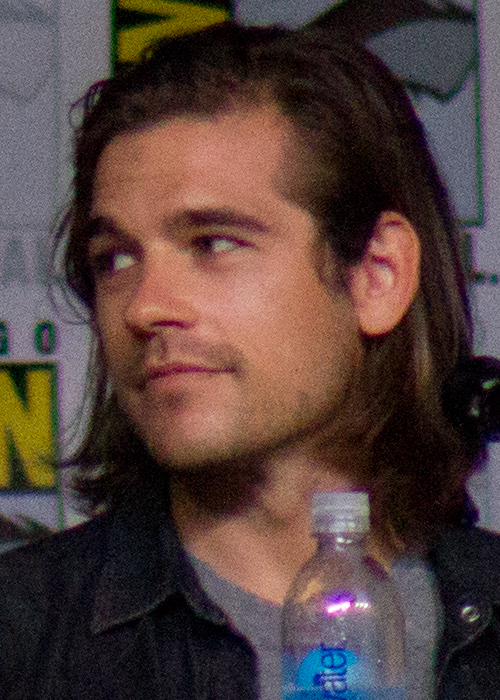
- Ralph in 2016
- Born: April 7, 1986 (age 40); West Palm Beach, Florida, U.S.
- Education: State University of New York, Purchase (BFA)
- Occupation: Actor
- Years active: 2010–present
- Spouse: Rachel Brosnahan (m. 2016)
- Relatives: Kate Spade (aunt-in-law)

Jason Ralph (born April 7, 1986) is an American actor and theater producer. Ralph began his career in theater, most notably performing in Peter and the Starcatcher on Broadway and off-Broadway and producing The Woodsman. From 2015 to 2019, he starred as Quentin Coldwater in the Syfy television series The Magicians. He has also had recurring roles on shows including Aquarius and Younger.

== Early life ==
Jason Ralph was born in West Palm Beach, Florida. He was raised in McKinney, Texas, a city outside of Dallas, and attended McKinney North High School, graduating in 2004. He studied acting at Collin College and then attended State University of New York at Purchase, where he graduated with a BFA degree in 2010.

== Career ==
In 2010, he co-founded the theater company Strangemen and Company with peers from Purchase College, including James Ortiz. As a co-artistic director of his company, Strangemen produced several plays including the Obie Award-winning production of The Woodsman by Ortiz. In the 2010s, Strangemen produced off-Broadway productions and workshops of The Little Mermaid, Free Delivery, On the Head of a Pin, The Woodsman, and Bernie and Mikey's Trip To the Moon, as well as an annual theater festival. In 2015 and 2018, they produced various workshops at the Guild Hall of East Hampton. As of 2018, Ralph serves as the company's Artistic Director and President.

In 2014, he starred in the comedy-drama movie I'm Obsessed with You alongside Manish Dayal, Rachel Brosnahan and Thomas McDonell. Also that year, he played the role of Ian Thompson in the film A Most Violent Year and starred in the pilot episode of Looking.

In 2015, he played the role of Harrison Dalton, the son of President Dalton in the CBS TV series Madam Secretary and as Mike Vickery in the NBC TV series Aquarius. He also played Stan in Manhattan. The same year, Ralph was cast as Quentin Coldwater, the lead role in the Syfy fantasy drama series The Magicians, which premiered on December 16, 2015. He starred in the show from 2015 to 2019.

== Personal life ==
It was reported in 2018 that Ralph had married actress Rachel Brosnahan, but Brosnahan later revealed in early 2019 that they had been married "for years" before their relationship became public. Both attended the Golden Globe Awards ceremony in 2019, where she thanked him during her acceptance speech.

== Acting credits ==
=== Film ===
Year	Title	Role
2013	Brightest Star	Gary
2014	I'm Obsessed with You	Jake Birnbaum
2014	A Most Violent Year	Ian Thompson
2015	Those People	Sebastian
2015	Stereotypically You	Brad
2020	I'm Thinking of Ending Things	Young Man

=== Television ===
Year	Title	Role	Notes
2010	The Good Wife	Student #2	Episode: "Breaking Fast"
2011	Gossip Girl	Sam	2 episodes
2011	Unforgettable	Zeke	Episode: "Friended"
2013	Smash	Fan	Episode: "The Producers"
2013	Blue Bloods	Jake Singer	Episode: "Justice Served"
2014	Looking	Jason	Episode: "Looking for Now "
2015	Grace and Frankie	William	Episode: "The Dinner "
2015–2016	Aquarius	Mike Vickery	10 episodes
2015	Madam Secretary	Harrison Dalton	5 episodes
2015	Manhattan	Stan	6 episodes
2015–2019	The Magicians	Quentin Coldwater	Main role (seasons 1–4); 52 episodes
2016	Dark Day	Ian Howe	Main cast; unaired pilot
2018	Younger	Jake Devereux	Recurring role; 5 episodes
2022–2023	The Marvelous Mrs. Maisel	Mike Carr	11 episodes
2024	Three Women	Aaron Knodel	Recurring role

=== Stage ===
Year	Title	Role	Venue	Notes	Producer
2011	IN	Jordy	Pioneer Theatre Company	Original production	
2011	The Dunes	Troy	Gallery Players Theatre	Original off-off-Broadway production	
2011	Home Movies	Sam	Dorothy Strelsin Theatre	Off-Broadway	check
2011	The Little Mermaid		McCarren Park	Brooklyn production	check
2012	Free Delivery	Barney	Made Fresh Daily	Off-off-Broadway	check
2012–2013	Peter and the Starcatcher	Understudy (Boy, Prentiss, et al.)	Brooks Atkinson Theatre	Original Broadway production	
2012–2013	Peter and the Starcatcher	Boy	New Worlds Stages	Off-Broadway transfer	
2012–2014	The Woodsman	—N/a	Standard Toycraft	Brooklyn production	check
2012–2014	The Woodsman	—N/a	Ars Nova	Off-Broadway	check
2012–2014	The Woodsman	—N/a	59E59 Theaters	Off-Broadway transfer	check
2013	On the Head of a Pin	Chris Conrad	59E59 Theaters	Off-Broadway	check
2018	Bernie and Mikey's Trip To the Moon	—N/a	59E59 Theaters	Off-Broadway	check
2019	The Courtroom		Great Hall (Cooper Union)	Staged reenactment	
2020	The Great Filter		The Wild Project	Off-off-Broadway	

=== Video games ===
Year	Title	Role	Notes
2010	Red Dead Redemption	The Local Population	Voice
