= Extrapolations (TV series) =

American anthology television miniseries

- Promotional poster
- Genre: Anthology; Drama; Dystopia; Science fiction; Climate fiction
- Created by: Scott Z. Burns
- Starring: Meryl Streep; Sienna Miller; Kit Harington; Edward Norton; Diane Lane; Daveed Diggs; Tahar Rahim; Yara Shahidi; Matthew Rhys; Gemma Chan; David Schwimmer; Adarsh Gourav; Keri Russell; Marion Cotillard; Forest Whitaker; Indira Varma; Tobey Maguire; Murray Bartlett; Cara Gee; Hari Nef; Gaz Choudhry
- Country of origin: United States
- Original language: English
- No. of episodes: 8

Production
- Executive producers: Scott Z. Burns; Michael Ellenberg; Dorothy Fortenberry; Gregory Jacobs; Lindsey Springer
- Cinematography: Matthew Jensen; Zack Galler; Eigil Bryld
- Editor: Greg O'Bryant
- Running time: 45–58 minutes
- Production companies: Wandering Jew Productions; Media Res

Original release
- Network: Apple TV+
- Release: March 17 – April 21, 2023

Extrapolations is an American climate fiction anthology television miniseries created by Scott Z. Burns for Apple TV+. The series premiered on March 17, 2023.

== Premise ==
An anthology series that depicts the effects of climate change on the planet through various different points of view through interconnected stories.

The series takes place from 2037 to 2070, a period of 33 years.

== Cast and characters ==
=== "2037: A Raven Story" ===
- Daveed Diggs as Marshall Zucker
- Kit Harington as Nicholas "Nick" Bilton
- Sienna Miller as Rebecca Shearer
- Tahar Rahim as Omar Haddad
- Matthew Rhys as Junior
- Heather Graham as Hannah
- Peter Riegert as Ben Zucker
- Yara Shahidi as Carmen Jalilo
- Leslie Uggams as Isabel Zucker
- Cherien Dabis as Lina
- Cara Gee as Freda

=== "2046: Whale Fall" ===
- Sienna Miller as Rebecca Shearer
- Meryl Streep as Eve Shearer
- Kit Harington as Nicholas "Nick" Bilton
- Tahar Rahim as Omar Haddad
- Joaopaulo Malheiro as young Ezra Haddad
- Eisa Davis as Christina
- Ato Essandoh as Marco
- Douglas Hodge as Hendricks

=== "2047: The Fifth Question" ===
- Daveed Diggs as Marshall Zucker
- David Schwimmer as Harris Goldblatt
- Judd Hirsch as David Goldblatt
- Nick Kroll as Alpha (voice)
- Neska Rose as Alana Goldblatt
- Leslie Uggams as Isabel Zucker
- Annelise Cepero as Julia
- Judy Gold as Sophie
- Kathryn Kates as Mrs. Goldblatt
- Marianne Rendón as Gabriela

=== "2059 Part I: Face of God" ===
- Diane Lane as Martha Russell
- Edward Norton as Jonathan Chopin
- Indira Varma as Gita Mishra
- Kit Harington as Nicholas "Nick" Bilton
- Michael Gandolfini as Rowan Chopin
- Cherry Jones as President Elizabeth Burdick
- Deidre Goodwin as Advisor
- Mía Maestro as Mariama Cruz
- Aimee Mullins as Secretary of State Garrett
- Ajay Naidu as Hiram McDowell
- Adarsh Gourav as Gaurav

=== "2059 Part II: Nightbirds" ===
- Adarsh Gourav as Gaurav
- Gaz Choudhry as Neel
- Keri Russell as Olivia Drew
- Zuleikha Robinson as Anusha
- Waris Ahluwalia as Dr. Harbaksh Mann
- Divya Sethi as Sanj

=== "2066: Lola" ===
- Gemma Chan as Natasha Alper
- Tahar Rahim as Ezra Haddad
- Joaopaulo Malheiro as Young Ezra Haddad
- Devika Bhise as Lola
- Tara Summers as Isabel Wick

=== "2068: The Going Away Party" ===
- Marion Cotillard as Sylvie Bolo
- Eiza González as Elodie
- Tobey Maguire as Nicolas / "Nic"
- Forest Whitaker as August "Auggie" Bolo
- Hari Nef as Anna

=== "2070: Ecocide" ===
- Kit Harington as Nicholas "Nick" Bilton / Nikolai Biltonov
- Diane Lane as Martha Russell
- Sienna Miller as Rebecca Shearer
- Edward Norton as Jonathan Chopin
- Murray Bartlett as Ariel Turner
- MaameYaa Boafo as Lucy Adobo
- Ben Harper as Tyrone Downs
- Anna Deavere Smith as Arden Miller
- Lily Buchanan as Decima Kabua

== Episodes ==
No.	Title	Directed by	Written by	Original release date
1	"2037: A Raven Story"	Scott Z. Burns	Scott Z. Burns	March 17, 2023
The world has come to a breaking point regarding the effects of climate change. Demonstrations, politics, and private enterprise factor in a decision of whether or not to contain the annual global temperature rise to under two degrees celsius per year.
2	"2046: Whale Fall"	Scott Z. Burns	Scott Z. Burns	March 17, 2023
Technology in 2046 allows Rebecca to communicate and befriend a humpback whale, who is inquiring about the whereabouts of another whale that can be heard.
3	"2047: The Fifth Question"	Gregory Jacobs	Teleplay by : Ruby Rae Spiegel and Gregory Jacobs & Scott Z. Burns; Story by : Scott Z. Burns	March 17, 2023
Rabbi Zucker is faced with multiple challenges: maintaining his Miami synagogue, preparing an inquisitive new young girl for her bat mitzvah, and bracing for an upcoming storm.
4	"2059 Part I: Face of God"	Ellen Kuras	Teleplay by : Scott Z. Burns; Story by : Dave Eggers	March 24, 2023
Ecoterrorist or Ecosaviour? Gita Mishra has a fleet of planes filled with calcium carbonate flying in the sky as she threatens to release their payloads as a way to solve the Earth's climate crisis one way or another. Her ex-husband Jonathan, advising the President of the United States during this crisis, watches in horror as he notices his own son actively assisting with Gita's plan.
5	"2059 Part II: Nightbirds"	Richie Mehta	Rajiv Joseph	March 31, 2023
In Mumbai, Neel and Gaurav take on a potentially dangerous mission to transport a secret item that could help save the planet. Assassin Olivia Drew's mission is to intercept them.
6	"2066: Lola"	Scott Z. Burns	Teleplay by : Sarah Nolen; Story by : Scott Z. Burns & Sarah Nolen	April 7, 2023
Ezra, last seen in episode 2, is now an adult, making a living responding to paid on-line requests to impersonate characters for people who are in difficult situations. The current global climate conditions further compound the whole situation with Ezra having to deal with his own issues involving Lola.
7	"2068: The Going Away Party"	Nicole Holofcener	Bess Wohl	April 14, 2023
Anna finds work as a maid for an intimate New Year's Eve party hosted by couple August and Sylvie, inviting their good friend Nicolas and his plus one, Elodie. The night turns out to be one to remember involving reduction of the carbon footprint as a way to overcome the current climate crisis.
8	"2070: Ecocide"	Michael Morris	Teleplay by : Dorothy Fortenberry & Diane Ademu-John and Scott Z. Burns & Ron Currie; Story by : Scott Z. Burns & Dorothy Fortenberry	April 21, 2023
Nick Bilton is sent to The Hague to stand trial before the International Criminal Court for his actions as Alpha CEO on the charge of ecocide. The world is aghast with his offering as a way to influence the outcome.

== Production ==
It was announced in January 2020 that Scott Z. Burns had been developing an anthology series about climate change that had been nearing a series order from Apple TV+. It would officially be greenlit in December for a ten-episode season.

Filming for the series had begun by October 2021 in New York City under the working title Gaia, with Burns serving as writer and director, and Meryl Streep, Sienna Miller, Kit Harington, Tahar Rahim, Matthew Rhys, Daveed Diggs, Gemma Chan, David Schwimmer, Adarsh Gourav, Forest Whitaker, Marion Cotillard, Tobey Maguire, and Eiza González cast to star. The series would now only run for an eight-episode season. In November, Edward Norton, Indira Varma, Keri Russell, Cherry Jones and Michael Gandolfini were added to the cast. In January 2022, additional castings were announced including Murray Bartlett, Yara Shahidi, Diane Lane, Heather Graham and Judd Hirsch. It was announced in February 2022 that Ellen Kuras would participate in the directing of the series.

== Reception ==
=== Critical response ===
The review aggregator website Rotten Tomatoes has reported a 44% approval rating with an average rating of 5.8/10, based on 44 critic reviews. The website's critics consensus says: Extrapolations civic-minded storytelling is so sprawling that it never coheres into a satisfying whole, although its sheer star power and good intentions make for a mildly intriguing lecture. Metacritic, which uses a weighted average, has assigned a score of 56 out of 100 based on 20 critics, indicating "mixed or average" reviews.

In a review published by the Los Angeles Review of Books, Aaron Bady criticized the show for primarily featuring the experiences of "Rich Americans". Bady also criticized the show for not "focusing" on fossil fuels.
