= Those People =

2015 film by Joey Kuhn

- Theatrical release poster
- Directed by: Joey Kuhn
- Screenplay by: Joey Kuhn
- Story by: Joey Kuhn; Grainne O'Hara Belluomo
- Produced by: Kimberly Parker; Joey Kuhn; Sarah Perlman Bremner
- Starring: Jonathan Gordon; Jason Ralph; Haaz Sleiman; Britt Lower; Meghann Fahy; Chris Conroy; Daniel Gerroll; Allison Mackie
- Cinematography: Leonardo D'Antoni
- Edited by: Sara Shaw
- Music by: Adam Crystal
- Production company: Little Big Horn Films
- Distributed by: Wolfe Releasing
- Release dates: May 16, 2015 (Seattle); May 6, 2016 (United States)
- Running time: 89 minutes
- Country: United States
- Language: English

Those People is a 2015 American romantic drama film written and directed by Joey Kuhn and starring Jonathan Gordon, Jason Ralph, and Haaz Sleiman. The cast also includes Britt Lower, Meghann Fahy in her film debut, Chris Conroy, Daniel Gerroll, and Allison Mackie.

Kuhn has described the film as having been inspired by his own experience falling in love with his best friend at college, as well as by his fascination with the story of Bernie Madoff's son Mark, who died by suicide two years after his father's arrest.

Those People had its world premiere at the Seattle International Film Festival on May 16, 2015. Distributed by Wolfe Releasing, the film opened in theaters in New York City and Los Angeles on May 6, 2016, and was released on DVD and video on demand on June 14.

During its festival run, the film won the Audience Award for Outstanding Feature Film at the 2015 NewFest: New York Lesbian, Gay, Bisexual, & Transgender Film Festival, as well as the Audience Award for Best First US Dramatic Feature at the 2015 Outfest Film Festival. The film was nominated for Outstanding Film – Limited Release at the 28th GLAAD Media Awards in 2017.

== Plot ==
Charlie, a young art student from New York City haunted by Joris-Karl Huysmans' "A Rebours", is asked by his best friend Sebastian to move into his apartment as he deals with depression and public scorn following his wealthy financier father Dick's arrest on high-profile white-collar criminal charges. Charlie's mother thinks this is a bad idea due to long-standing one-sided romantic feelings he has for Sebastian. On a night out with Sebastian and a wider group of friends Charlie meets and flirts with Lebanon-born bar-pianist Tim. The two have chemistry, but when Sebastian is refused service at the bar because of his father, the group abruptly leaves. On their way back to Sebastian's apartment they are chased by paparazzi. The events of the night worsen Sebastian's depression.

Charlie and a couple of his friends attend a classical music concert and notice Tim is the pianist. After the show, Charlie and Tim spend the night together talking and share a kiss, beginning a relationship which leads Charlie to begin neglecting Sebastian. Tim soon professes love for Charlie, but sensing Charlie is holding back on account of his feelings for Sebastian, Tim breaks up with him. At a Halloween party Charlie is depressed at his break-up but makes a pass at Sebastian, who laughs it off. Later that night Sebastian has brought a guy home with them, which upsets Charlie who professes his feelings. They begin a threesome encounter at the date's suggestion, but Sebastian storms out and Charlie tells the guy to leave. Sebastian rejects Charlie, saying it would ruin their friendship. Charlie moves out and reunites with Tim.

Tim is offered a dream job as pianist for the San Francisco Symphony, which would require a move he asks Charlie to also make. Sebastian visits his father in jail, and he tells him to continue his crimes which causes Sebastian to disown his father after an argument. His father hangs himself in his cell. Charlie struggles to break the news of his leaving New York to Sebastian at a tense dinner with their friends and Tim. The news causes Sebastian to stand on his apartment balcony prepared to jump. Charlie talks him down but Tim breaks up with him again, believing he'll always come second. Sebastian moves in with Charlie and his mother and begins to slowly recover. On the eve of Tim's departure for San Francisco Sebastian calls him and he and Charlie spend one more night and part on sad but good terms, admitting it's not their time despite their feelings for each other. Some time later Charlie has completed his Master's thesis art exhibition using himself for inspiration, rather than Sebastian, for the first time. Meanwhile Sebastian is preparing to leave New York for a fresh start, and the film ends with one more friends gathering as Sebastian and Charlie toast to their friendship with the rest of the group.

== Cast ==
- Jonathan Gordon as Charlie
- Jason Ralph as Sebastian
- Haaz Sleiman as Tim
- Meghann Fahy as London
- Britt Lower as Ursula
- Chris Conroy as Wyatt
- Allison Mackie as Priscilla
- Max Jenkins as "Dracula"

== See also ==
- List of lesbian, gay, bisexual or transgender-related films of 2015
