= Seva Granik =

American party promoter

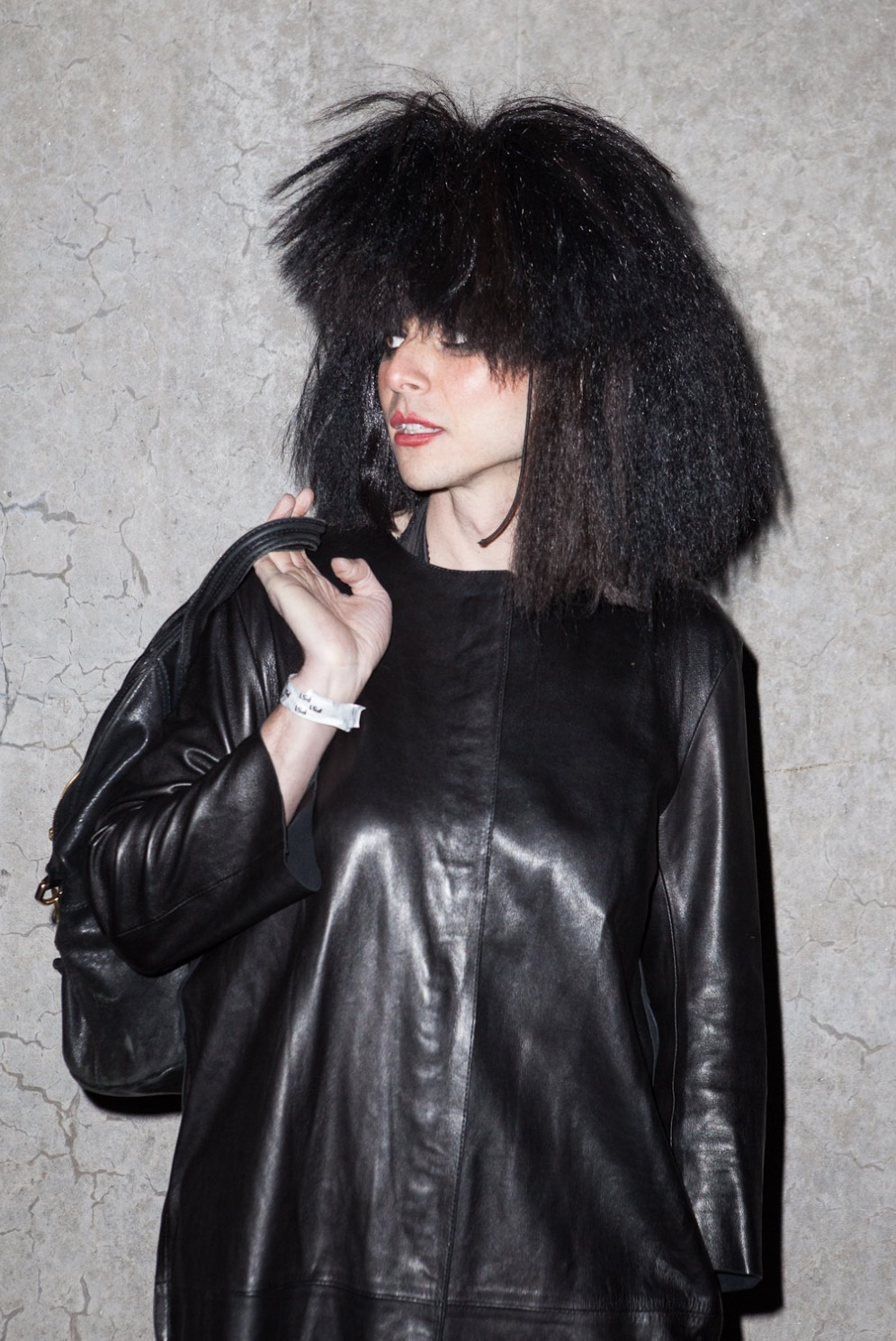
- Seva Granik
- Born: April 20, 1975 (age 51); Tashkent, Uzbekistan
- Occupation: Party promoter
- Spouse: Kay Gabriel

Seva Granik (born April 20, 1975 in Tashkent, Uzbekistan) is a New York City-based party promoter. He is married to the writer Kay Gabriel.

== Background ==
Born in Tashkent, Uzbekistan, Granik immigrated to Brooklyn, where he became involved in Brooklyn's underground techno rave scene.

Dubbed "the reigning king of NY nightlife" by i-D Magazine, Granik has since become an event producer, holding parties for queer Brooklynites as well as the international world of high-end fashion.

== Nightlife and events ==
In 2005, along with his roommate and friends, Granik started the email listserv and experiential events company MyOpenBar, which published information about open bars and notable nightlife events, and produced parties featuring experimental performances in off-the-grid settings. Between 2005 and 2009, MyOpenBar opened offices in Austin, Miami, Los Angeles, Seattle, Boston, and Washington, D.C.

Following the closure of MyOpenBar in 2009, Granik and ex-MyOpenBar editorial director Rebecca Smeyne launched ABRACADABRA, a boutique underground performative events agency that showcased left-field and unusual talent in unsanctioned venues.

In 2010, Granik joined the curatorial committee at MoMA PS1's Warm Up event series as Bookings and Production Manager. He quit this position the following year.

In 2013, Granik partnered with the NYC nightlife personality and event producer Ladyfag on the launch of SHADE, the first queer underground rave event series in New York. Granik and Ladyfag also produced New York Fashion Week parties, for such clients as Givenchy, Alexander Wang, Dsquared2, and magazines such as Maurizio Cattelan and Pierpaolo Ferrari's Toilet Paper.

In 2015, as an employee of the fashion PR and events agency KCD, Granik acted as the senior producer on fashion runway shows for clients including Derek Lam and Narciso Rodriguez.

The aforementioned seminal event series SHADE ran for three years and was shut down in the fall of 2015 as Granik's next underground queer rave project, UNTER, was already underway.

Eschewing press and media coverage, UNTER was an underground techno rave project that frequently moved between unsanctioned locations and spawned several spinoff event series highlighting the diversity of musical genres in the dance music underground, such as gabber, "slambient," House music, and faster strains of techno.

Throughout this time, Granik contributed his writing and voice to various print and online publications such as Medium andVice.

In 2018, Granik was invited by New York University to write a syllabus for and teach a course on producing electronic dance music events.

In the fall of 2023, Granik shut down the UNTER project. Two new underground party series were launched in the spring of 2024: Faggots Are Women (with his partner Kay Gabriel and friends), and Zero Chill.

In the fall of 2024, Granik co-produced FKA Twig's Eusexua Brooklyn event, a dance party and an installation that sought to promote the artist's eponymous new album.

In 2025, Granik cofounded the Queer Nightlife Community Center (QNCC) with Michael Falco.

== Art ==
In the summer of 2023, Granik partnered with the NYC-based trans artist Ruby Zarsky on "ALL DOLLED UP," a one-night immersive art installation of NYC's first and only Trans-Women Dancers Strip Club featuring all trans women performers.

In the fall of 2023, Granik produced and co-directed "CHOKE HOLE,"^{[13]} a queer drag wrestling show.
