= Hari Nef =

American actress, model, and writer (born 1992)

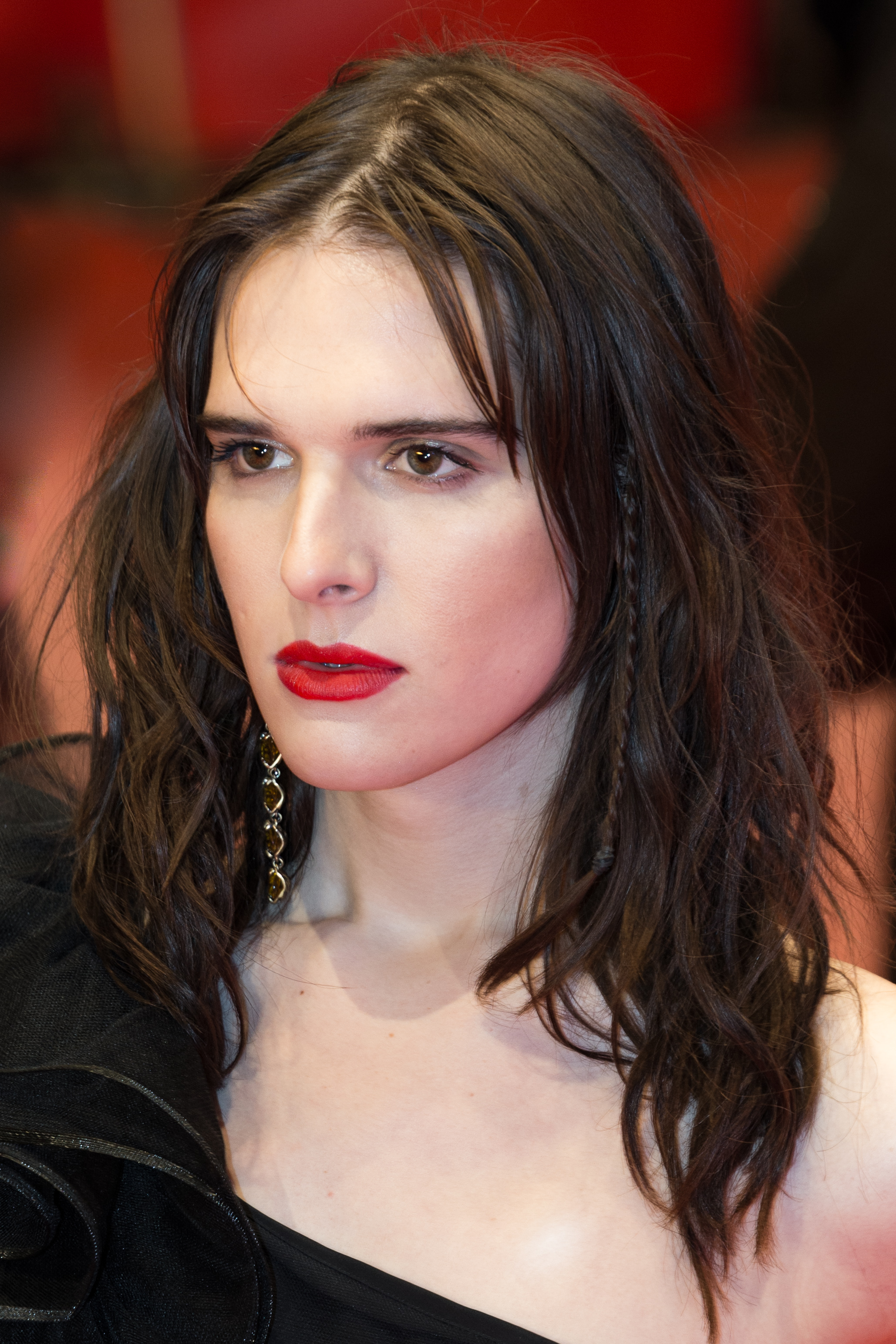
- Nef in 2017
- Born: October 21, 1992 (age 33); Philadelphia, Pennsylvania, U.S.
- Education: Columbia University (BA)
- Occupations: Actress; model; writer
- Years active: 2011–present
- Modeling information
- Height: 5 ft 9.5 in (1.77 m)
- Hair color: Brown
- Eye color: Hazel
- Agency: IMG Models (worldwide)

Hari Nef (born October 21, 1992) is an American actress, model, and writer. Nef's breakthrough role was Gittel in the Amazon original series Transparent, for which she was nominated for a Screen Actors Guild Award for Outstanding Performance by an Ensemble in a Comedy Series in 2016.

She made her runway debut at New York Fashion Week Spring 2015, walking for both Hood By Air and Eckhaus Latta, and subsequently became the first openly transgender woman signed to IMG Models. She became the first openly transgender woman to appear on the cover of a major British magazine. Nef has written on a range of topics from fine art and film to sex, gender, and transgender identity. She lives and works in New York City.

== Early life and education ==
Hari Nef was born in Philadelphia into a Jewish family. Her parents are David Neff, an advertising executive, and Robin Clebnik. Her parents divorced when she was two and she was raised by her mother in Newton, Massachusetts. She attended Newton South High School and was part of the school's South Stage program.

Nef graduated from Columbia University in May 2015 with a degree in theater.

== Career ==
=== Acting ===
Nef starred as Tante Gittel in the 2015 Emmy-winning television series Transparent. Gittel's character is a Pfefferman family ancestor who lived her life as a cross-dresser in Berlin, Germany during the Weimar Republic and eventually was murdered during the Holocaust. Creator Joey Soloway wrote the part for Nef after the two connected on social media and attended a PFLAG party together. Nef received a 2016 SAG Award nomination for the role.

In 2018, Nef starred as a major lead in Sam Levinson's comedy thriller Assassination Nation. The film stars Nef alongside Odessa Young, Suki Waterhouse, and Abra. In the same year, she had a recurring role as Blythe on the Lifetime psychological thriller television series You. In 2018, Nef made her New York theater debut as a lead in Jeremy O. Harris' Daddy.

In 2022, Nef starred in the comedy film 1Up, alongside Ruby Rose, Paris Berelc, Taylor Zakhar Perez, and Nicholas Coombe. In August, it was announced that Nef would portray Candy Darling in a biopic from Transparent writer Stephanie Kornick.

Later that year, Nef returned to the stage and starred in Denis Johnson's play, Des Moines, at the Polonsky Shakespeare Center in Brooklyn. She performed in Thomas Bradshaw's debut of his adaptation of Anton Chekhov’s classic play, The Seagull, alongside Parker Posey, Patrick Foley, and Nat Wolff in spring 2023.

Nef starred in the 2023 HBO drama series The Idol followed by a role in Barbie directed by Greta Gerwig.

=== Writing ===
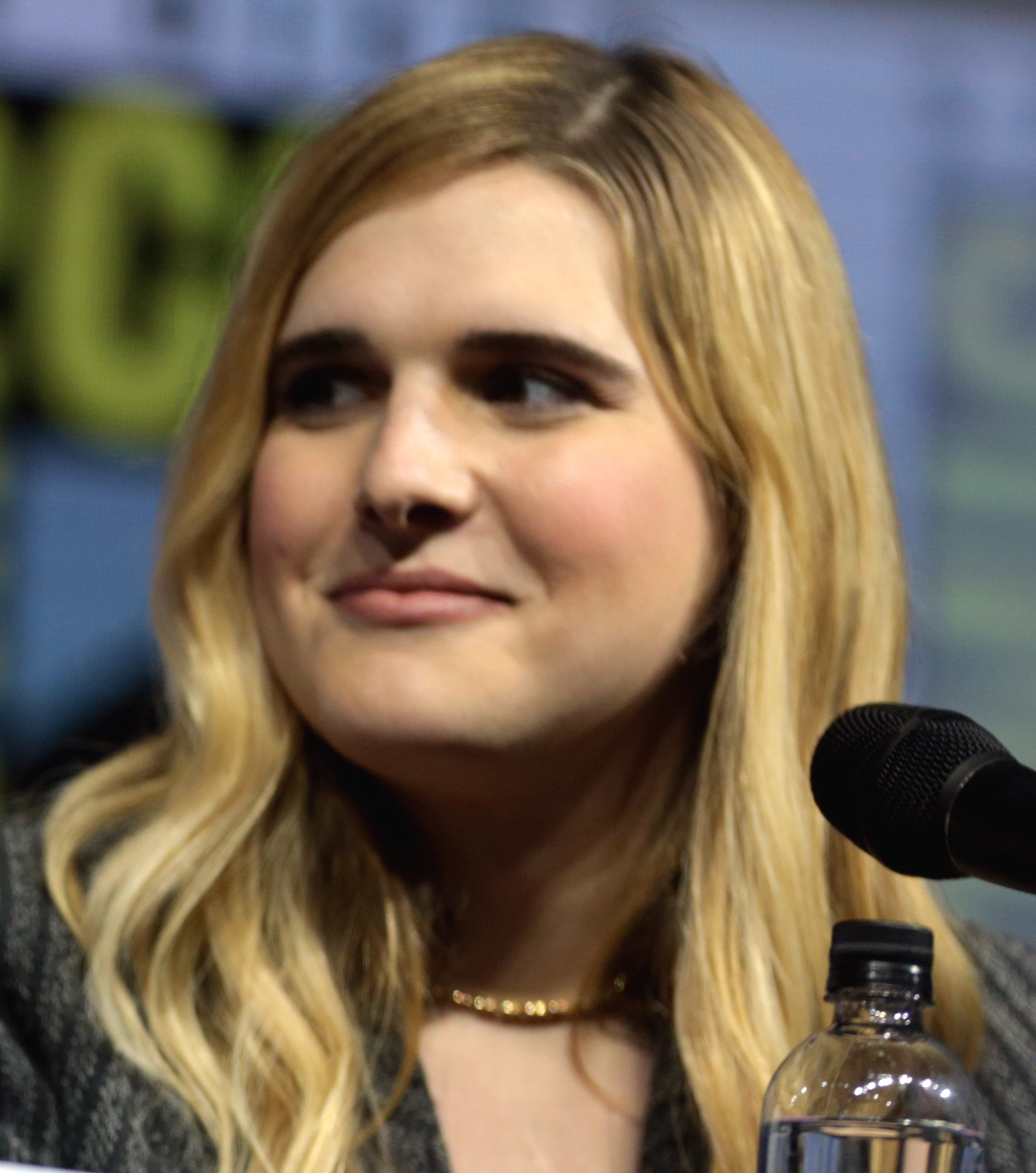
Nef at the 2018 San Diego Comic-Con

Nef has written profiles on various artists and cultural figures including director John Waters, singer/actress Cristina Ortiz Rodriguez, Javier Calvo and Javier Ambrossi's Spanish biographical series Veneno, painter Nash Glynn, and Lucas Hilderbrand's book, “The Bars Are Ours." Nef wrote a regular sex advice and experience column for Sarah Nicole Prickett's Adult magazine. Her writing has appeared in The New York Times, Artforum, Dazed, Vice, Original Plumbing, L'Officiel, and BlackBook.

=== Modeling ===
In 2014, Nef was on the cover of Frische Magazine. That same year, she was placed at number 68 on Dazed's 100 list. Nef also moved to the top of the Dazed Readers 100, ranking number one overall, and appeared in the i-D Pre-Fall Issue twice.

In 2015, she again walked shows during New York Fashion Week, including Adam Selman, VFiles, Vejas, Degen, and Eckhaus Latta once more. In May of the same year, Nef was signed to IMG Models, making her the first openly transgender model signed to that agency. In the summer of 2015, Nef was cast in the second season of Amazon Prime's Transparent, which debuted in December 2015. She also starred in The Drums' music video "There Is Nothing Left" in August. The Forward newspaper included her in the Forward 50, a list of the year's 50 most influential Jewish-Americans.

Elle printed special collectors' covers for their September 2016 issue, and one of them featured Nef, which was the first time an openly transgender woman had been on the cover of a major commercial British magazine.

In January 2017, Nef starred in a television commercial for the L'Oréal Paris True Match line alongside Blake Lively, Lara Stone, and Xiao Wen Ju. The campaign was premiered at the 2017 Golden Globe Awards telecast.

Nef walked nine runways during New York Fashion Week for the Spring/Summer 2023 season.

== Personal life ==
Nef is transgender. In an interview with Elle, Nef said, "[As a teenager,] I wanted to wear certain clothes and couldn't. I sort of did it anyway, but there was always a friction with my peers and a mother who was less close-minded than worried." Nef began transitioning while attending Columbia University and is an advocate for transgender women and girls.

Nef has spoken out against Israel and in support of Palestine. She was arrested along with Chelsea Manning and nearly 100 others at an anti-war protest led by Jewish Voice for Peace in New York City on April 13, 2026. Nef told Vogue: “I am Jewish. I was raised Jewish. I’m proud of my Jewish culture. I’m proud of my Jewish heritage. I am not a Zionist, and I oppose the settler-colonial project of Israel, the way it’s being carried out.”

== Acting credits ==
=== Film ===
Year	Title	Role	Notes
2013	Hellaware	Cy	
2014	She Told Me She Was Dead	Amber Mugabe	Short film
2015	Self Aware	Hari	Short film
2015	Family Tree	Hari	Short film
2016	Crush	Clare	Short film
2017	A–Z of Hair		Short film
2018	Mapplethorpe	Tinkerbelle	
2018	Assassination Nation	Bex Warren	
2020	First Date	Alex	Short film
2022	1Up	Sloane	
2022	Meet Cute	Chai	
2022	Simchas and Sorrows	Rabbi Cohen	
2023	Barbie	Doctor Barbie	
2023	Bad Things	Cal	
2024	Who Am I?	Depression	

=== Television ===
Year	Title	Role	Notes
2015	Transparent	Gittel	Recurring role
2017	Love Advent	Herself	Episode: "Hari Nef"
2018	You	Blythe	Recurring role
2018	Camping	Nia	Episode: "Up All Night"
2020	Acting for a Cause	Polonius	Episode: "Hamlet"
2020	Room 104	Katherine	Episode: "The Murderer"
2022	And Just Like That...	Rabbi Jen	Episode: "Seeing the Light"
2022	The Marvelous Mrs. Maisel	L. Roy Dunham	Episode: "Maisel vs. Lennon: The Cut Contest"
2023	Extrapolations	Anna	Episode: "2068: The Going-Away Party"
2023	The Idol	Talia	Recurring role
2025	All's Fair	Maria Coulatis	2 episodes

=== Theater ===
Year	Title	Role	Venue	Notes
2019	"Daddy"	Alessia	The New Group	Off-Broadway
2022	Des Moines	Jimmy	Theatre for a New Audience	Off-Broadway
2023	The Seagull/Woodstock, NY	Sasha	The New Group	Off-Broadway
2026	The Perverse		Queer Nightlife Community Center	Off-Broadway
2026	Pre-Existing Condition	A	Greenwich House Theater	Off-Broadway

=== Podcasts ===
Year	Title	Role	Notes
2020	Day by Day	Annabelle Clarke (voice)	Episode: "#AnnabelleClarkeIsOverParty"
