= Coming to Terms with the Dead =

- Directed by: Pascale Ferran
- Written by: Pierre Trividic; Pascale Ferran
- Produced by: Aline Mehouel
- Starring: Didier Sandre; Charles Berling
- Cinematography: Jean-Claude Larrieu
- Edited by: Guy Lecorne
- Music by: Béatrice Thiriet
- Production companies: Cinéa; Eclipsa Films; La Sept Cinéma; Pan Européenne Production
- Distributed by: Pan Européenne Distribution
- Release dates: May 1994 (Cannes); 5 October 1994 (France)
- Running time: 104 minutes
- Country: France
- Language: French
- Box office: $2.2 million

Coming to Terms with the Dead (French: Petits arrangements avec les morts) is a 1994 French drama film directed by Pascale Ferran. It won the Caméra d'Or at the 1994 Cannes Film Festival.

== Cast ==
- Didier Sandre as Vincent
- Alexandre Zloto as young Vincent
- Catherine Ferran as Zaza
- Agathe De Chassey as young Zaza
- Audrey Boitel as Lili
- Charles Berling as François
- Mathieu Robinot as young François
- Didier Bezace as Rene
- Nadia Barentin as The mother
- Jean Dautremay as The father
- Guillaume Charras as Jumbo
- Danièle Douet as Jumbo's mother
- Bruno Todeschini as Jumbo's father
- Guillaume Raynal as Bruno
- Dominique Constanza as Bruno's mother
- Alain Pralon as Dr. Le Bihan
- Emmanuelle Bach as The journalist
- Marc Betton as Zaza's doctor
- Jean Pélégri as an old man
- Muriel Mayette as Zaza's colleague
