= Annelise Cepero =

American actress and model

- Born: August 31, 1995 (age 31)
- Occupations: Actress, model
- Years active: 2014–present

Annelise Cepero (born August 31, 1995) is an American actress and model.

Raised in Yonkers, New York, Cepero graduated from The Harvey School in 2013, where she decided to explore a career in the arts. She would study at Montclair State University, graduating in 2017 with a Bachelor of Fine Arts in Musical Theatre.

In early 2018, Cepero responded to an audition call for Steven Spielberg's remake of West Side Story, and would eventually secure the role of Provi in the film later in the year following several callbacks. She was officially announced for the cast in April 2019. Following her appearance in the film, Cepero would appear in guest roles in television series such as Pose, Law & Order: Special Victims Unit and Blue Bloods. In 2022, she starred in the film Simchas and Sorrows. and in the HBO Max holiday comedy film Holiday Harmony alongside Jeremy Sumpter and Brooke Shields. She would appear in the Apple TV+ series Extrapolations in 2023, as well as in a recurring guest role in the procedural drama 9-1-1. However, her role in the series would finish as a result of creative changes, and Cepero opting not to commute to Los Angeles to film while she lived in New York City.

In addition to acting, Cepero has worked in modeling, participating in New York Fashion Week and working an ad campaign for the Japanese casual wear retailer Uniqlo.

== Filmography ==
=== Film ===
| Year | Title | Role | Notes |
|---|---|---|---|
| 2021 | West Side Story | Provi | |
| 2022 | Simchas and Sorrows | Glaucia | |
| 2022 | Holiday Harmony | Gail | |

=== Television ===
| Year | Title | Role | Notes |
|---|---|---|---|
| 2019 | God Friended Me | Coat Checker | 1 episode |
| 2021 | Chicago P.D. | Maria Guerra | 1 episode |
| 2021 | Pose | Jimena | 1 episode |
| 2021 | Law & Order: Special Victims Unit | Jasmine Castro | 1 episode |
| 2021–2022 | Blue Bloods | Elena Marquez | 2 episodes |
| 2023 | Extrapolations | Julia | Miniseries, 1 episode |
| 2023 | 9-1-1 | Natalia | 3 episodes |
