= I'm Obsessed with You (But You've Got to Leave Me Alone) =

2014 film

- Directed by: Jon Goracy
- Written by: Genevieve Adams
- Produced by: Genevieve Adams; Jon Goracy; Ken Greenblatt
- Starring: Manish Dayal; Rachel Brosnahan; Thomas McDonell; Genevieve Adams; Jason Ralph
- Cinematography: Bartosz Nalazek
- Edited by: Christopher Branca; Alan Scott Neal; Vincent F. Welch
- Music by: Graham Edward Lebron; Shanna Mahan
- Release date: 2014
- Running time: 99 minutes
- Country: United States
- Language: English

I’m Obsessed with You (But You’ve Got to Leave Me Alone) is a 2014 American comedy-drama film directed by Jon Goracy, written by Genevieve Adams, and starring Manish Dayal, Rachel Brosnahan, Thomas McDonell, Adams and Jason Ralph.

The film was based on an off-Broadway play, IMPROVed, written by Genevieve Adams. Adams developed the play from her Dartmouth College senior thesis. After the Broadway success of IMPROVed, Adams created a Kickstarter campaign to raise funds for the production of a feature film based on the play. Following his work with Adams on IMPROVed, Goracy joined the production team for I’m Obsessed with You as the film’s director. The film was shot in Dartmouth College, New York City, and the Hamptons.

The film premiered at the Sonoma International Film Festival in April 2014. It was released on video on demand on 11 November 2014 but later removed from all online platforms by Adams in 2021.

In April 2025, the podcast Hyperfixed released an episode investigating the film's status after receiving an email from a listener who was unable to find it. Host Alex Goldman ultimately tracked down Adams, who discussed the events that led to the film's removal and said she had assumed there was no longer any public interest. As a result of the episode, the film was reuploaded to Amazon Prime where it is currently available in the United States.

== Plot ==
When a magnetic movie star crashes their party the day before graduation, four collegiate comedians are forced to confront the group's friendship and future.

== Cast ==
- Manish Dayal as Cyrus Kapoor
- Rachel Brosnahan as Nell Fitzpatrick
- Thomas McDonell as Freddie Diaz
- Olek Krupa as Stanislaw
- Jason Ralph as Jake Birnbaum
- Genevieve Adams as Keri Langdon
- Neil Casey as Flamboyant Fan
