= Simchas and Sorrows =

2022 American romantic comedy-drama film

- Directed by: Genevieve Adams
- Written by: Genevieve Adams
- Produced by: Genevieve Adams; Matt Ott; Jackie Donohoe; Hari Nef; Hannah Swayze; Lila Claghorn
- Starring: Genevieve Adams; Thomas McDonell; Hari Nef
- Music by: Esin Aydingoz
- Production companies: Term Paper Productions; Ataria Pictures
- Distributed by: Gravitas Ventures (U.S.)
- Release date: April 7, 2022 (Cinequest Film Festival)
- Running time: 117 minutes
- Country: United States
- Language: English

Simchas and Sorrows is a 2022 American dramedy film written, directed and starring Genevieve Adams. The film also stars Thomas McDonell and Hari Nef, and explores the complexities and challenges of interfaith relationships, particularly focusing on the issue of religious conversion.

== Plot ==
Agnes is a struggling actress living in Brooklyn who was raised Catholic and is now an atheist. She has just learned she is pregnant. Before she has had a chance to tell her boyfriend Levi, he proposes; she accepts and immediately tells him of her pregnancy.

Levi is very close to his Jewish family who are ecstatic about the prospect of the marriage and child. Agnes is asked to convert to Judaism in order to appease Levi's family and maintain their traditions. Being an atheist, she struggles with the decision but decides to give it a try. She attends classes led by Rabbi Cohen, a progressive and open-minded rabbi who teaches Judaism to people from diverse backgrounds. Meanwhile, Levi's conservative brother, Abe, and his non-Jewish fiancée, Glaucia, constantly challenge and belittle Agnes and Levi's choices, creating a tense and competitive atmosphere.

Amidst the conflicts and pressures from their respective families, Agnes remains steadfast in her own values and self-assuredness. She draws strength from her eccentric grandfather, Nate, who supports her unconditionally and encourages her to stay true to herself. Agnes's unwavering belief that love, not belief, should be the foundation of her conversion resonates throughout the narrative. As Agnes and Levi face philosophical debates, including the contentious issue of having a Christmas tree, their relationship is put to the test. Levi's insecurities and lack of support strain their bond, leading them to question whether they should proceed with the marriage and conversion. Ultimately, their journey becomes an exploration of personal growth, self-discovery, and the power of staying true to one's convictions.

== Cast ==
- Genevieve Adams as Agnes
- Thomas McDonell as Levi
- Hari Nef as Rabbi Cohen
- Luke Forbes as Everett
- Julie Halston as Maude
- Chip Zien as Mortimer
- John Cullum as Nate
- Annelise Cepero as Glaucia
- Billy Calder as Abe
- Toryn Isabella Coote as Sparrow
- Tom Kemp as Frederick
- Gregg Bello as Sheldon
- Stevenn Beck as Uncle Jeremy
- Jack Berenholtz as Jourdan
- Haddie Bostic as Little Agnes
- Lila Claghorn as Mary
- Matthew Courson as Young Man
- Juliana Davies as Liya

== Production ==
Simchas and Sorrows was written and directed by Genevieve Adams. The film is Adams's directorial debut and the script is partly inspired by Adams's own life and marriage. She says of making the film:

Simchas and Sorrows is a labor of love [...] I saw a film when I was in the fifth grade called Keeping the Faith and it really inspired me then and now. Ben Stiller plays a rabbi and Ed Norton is his best friend, a Catholic priest. They reconnect with a friend from childhood, played brilliantly by Jenna Elfman, who challenges them to question their faith. I thought it was such a funny, beautiful and heartfelt story about real people grappling with life's unanswerable questions. It was one of those experiences in the movie theater where I was truly moved and thought, 'I want to do that. I want to tell stories like that and make people laugh and think.' Comedy is hard to do, and just because the story may seem 'light' or rom-com-y, doesn't mean it's less hard hitting [...] So, the goal with Simchas and Sorrows was to get at some serious dilemmas through a comedic lens.

Adams was also a producer on the film with Term Paper Productions and Ataria Pictures. Filming took place in New York City. The music for the film was scored by Esin Aydingoz.

Simchas and Sorrows premiered at the virtual showcase "Cinejoy" – part of the Cinequest Film & Creativity Festival held on April 1–17, 2022, in San Jose, California. In July 2022, Gravitas Ventures acquired the North American distribution rights for the film in a deal negotiated by Glen Reynolds from Circus Road Films.

== Reception ==
Simchas and Sorrows has received generally positive reviews from critics, with praise for its exploration of faith, identity, and relationships. Neely Swanson, in an article for Easy Reader, acknowledges the autobiographical nature of the film and applauds Genevieve Adams's portrayal of Agnes. Swanson describes Agnes as a strong, level-headed character who navigates the conflicts arising from her engagement and the prospect of converting to Judaism. Swanson appreciates the film's realistic depiction of everyday life, finding it relatable and enjoyable. While Swanson acknowledges that the story of interfaith relationships has been told before, she commends Adams's charming direction and the performances. Andrew Sweatman from Arthouse Garage praises the film's exploration of religious belief and the Jewish faith, particularly highlighting the scenes with Rabbi Cohen, which he describes as "delivered beautifully by Nef, and […] some of the best scenes in the film". Sweatman also notes the subtle and understated humor in the film, appreciating its wry and low-key tone. While Sweatman finds some of the comedic dialogue and scenarios unrealistic, he commends Adams's wry sense of humor and the performances in the film.

Alan Ng in his review for Film Threat praises the authenticity of the film's storytelling and the journey of the protagonist. Ng praises Adams's performance as Agnes, emphasizing her intimate connection with the character. Also highlighted is the performance of Nef as Rabbi Cohen and the supporting performances of veteran actors Chip Zien and John Cullum. Patrick Gibbs, writing for SLUG Magazine, also praises the ensemble cast including Broadway icons Cullum and Zien. He commends Adams's directorial debut and finds Simchas and Sorrows an engaging exploration of the complexities of being Jewish in today's world.

On Rotten Tomatoes, the film has an approval rating of 70% based on reviews from 10 critics, with an average rating of 5.7 out of 10.
