= 10 Things I Hate About Life =

Cancelled film by Gil Junger

- Official poster
- Directed by: Gil Junger
- Written by: Jeanette Issa; Gil Junger; Tim McGrath
- Based on: 10 Things I Hate About You; 1999 film by Karen McCullah and Kirsten Smith
- Produced by: Andrew Lazar; Tim McGrath; Gary Smith
- Starring: Evan Rachel Wood; Thomas McDonell; Billy Campbell; Élodie Yung
- Cinematography: Rogier Stoffers
- Production companies: Mad Chance Productions; Intandem Films; Polaris Pictures
- Distributed by: Vision Films
- Running time: 30 minutes
- Country: United States
- Language: English
- Budget: $11 million

10 Things I Hate About Life is an unfinished American romantic comedy film directed and written by Gil Junger, and starring Evan Rachel Wood, Thomas McDonell and Billy Campbell. It tells the story of Willow and Ben who meet while attempting suicide and fall in love. While not a direct sequel to Junger's 10 Things I Hate About You (1999), it bred the same genre with some similar themes.

Filming began in late 2012, but was interrupted after two months due to management changes at the production company and Wood's pregnancy. In late 2013, production was set to resume, with an estimated wrap date of April 2014, though filming was delayed indefinitely following Wood's departure. Producers sued for $30 million for breach of contract; Wood's lawyers have responded that she was never adequately paid since the production company ran out of money. Some production stills, from approximately 30 minutes of footage, have been released, but as of 2026 the lawsuit is ongoing and the film is seen as unlikely to ever resume shooting.

== Plot ==
The film begins with Willow and Ben, both determined to take their own lives, pulling up to a scenic cliff overlooking the ocean. While Ben takes out a gun and prepares it, Willow drives off the cliff. Ben is briefly startled, but then continues. As he holds the gun to his head and prepares to fire, Willow, her face covered in white powder from the deployment of her car's airbag, comes up from the cliff and asks "Can I borrow that when you're done?"

Ben and Willow put off their suicide plans and spend more time together, falling in love and gradually finding in each other a reason to live.

== Cast ==
- Evan Rachel Wood as Willow
  - Meghan Barton as Young Willow
- Thomas McDonell as Ben
- Billy Campbell
- Élodie Yung
- Ezra Masters
- Janet Montgomery

== Production ==
On May 9, 2012, it was announced that Gil Junger would direct the film from his own script, with Intandem Films and Mad Chance Productions producing the film; Andrew Lazar, who produced the original 10 Things I Hate About You in 1999, would re-assume that role for this film. Vision Films acquired the distribution rights to the film.

=== Casting ===
On May 9, 2012, Hayley Atwell was added to the cast of the film to star as lead. She changed her mind and later in the year, Evan Rachel Wood took the part. On November 30, 2012, Élodie Yung joined to star along with Wood. On January 14, 2013, Billy Campbell also joined the cast of the film.

=== Filming ===
The shooting was set to start in November 2012 in Los Angeles. However, shooting actually commenced a month later, on December 17, 2012, in Los Angeles. On January 14, 2013, The Hollywood Reporter reported shooting as still being underway in Los Angeles.

However, in late February 2013, it was announced that the film's producer, Gary Smith, was stepping down from his position as CEO of Intandem Films and that filming for 10 Things I Hate About Life was to be put on hold. The company said that this was not because of Smith's departure but rather due to Evan Rachel Wood's pregnancy, and that filming would resume that September or some time in the second half of the year.

In the interim, the producers released a promotional trailer from the existing footage, meant to attract interest from potential investors. Interspersed with the footage are scenes with Junger talking about the film and the money it could make. Also included are scenes of Skylar Grey singing "Wear Me Out", which Junger cites as a selling point.

After several months of no shooting reports or announcements, on November 7, 2013, it was announced that filming would re-commence after a several-month break on December 11 in and around Los Angeles and Malibu and that it would be wrapped up by April 2014. Vision Films released some photos from the film on November 11, 2013, and reported that about 30 minutes had been completed.

== Legal ==
In June 2014, Variety reported that Wood was being sued for $30 million by the producers for allegedly refusing to continue working on the film. Wood's lawyers dismissed the suit as "preposterous" and stated that Wood stopped working on the production after producers failed to pay her.

As of 2026 it has been reported that the lawsuit has not been resolved, and the film as started will never be completed.

== See also ==
- List of abandoned and unfinished films
