= Bird People (film) =

2014 film

- Film poster
- Directed by: Pascale Ferran
- Written by: Guillaume Bréaud; Pascale Ferran
- Produced by: Denis Freyd
- Starring: Anaïs Demoustier; Josh Charles; Roschdy Zem; Camélia Jordana; Taklyt Vongdara; Geoffrey Cantor; Clark Johnson; Radha Mitchell
- Cinematography: Julien Hirsch
- Edited by: Mathilde Muyard
- Music by: Béatrice Thiriet
- Production companies: Archipel 35; France 2 Cinéma; Titre et Structure Production
- Distributed by: Diaphana Distribution
- Release dates: 19 May 2014 (Cannes); 4 June 2014 (France)
- Running time: 128 minutes
- Country: France
- Languages: French; English
- Budget: $7.9 million
- Box office: $866.000

Bird People is a 2014 French drama film directed by Pascale Ferran and starring Josh Charles and Anaïs Demoustier. It was screened in the Un Certain Regard section at the 2014 Cannes Film Festival. It was also screened in the Contemporary World Cinema section at the 2014 Toronto International Film Festival.

== Plot ==
University student Audrey Camuzet works in Paris as a hotel maid where Gary Newman, an American businessman from Silicon Valley, is staying. The night after his meeting, Gary has difficulty sleeping and suffers a panic attack. When morning arrives, he stays in his room, deliberately misses his flight to Dubai where he had further business. He decides to quit his job, divorce his wife Elizabeth, leave his family and remain in the hotel indefinitely.

Audrey tidies Gary's room after initially being surprised to find that he had not yet departed and discovers he was supposed to already be in Dubai. When the hotel experiences an electrical blackout, she goes to the roof to investigate and transforms into a sparrow. She glides down to the ground, overhears other people's conversations, practices her new found flying abilities and peeps into various hotel rooms. After checking on Gary, she returns to the hotel roof and finds herself unable to return to her human form.

That night, she follows coworker Simon in his car to a park where he sleeps. After escaping attacks by a cat and an owl, she returns to the hotel roof. In the morning, she awakens in her original form once again. Later, Audrey literally bumps into Gary as he checks out of the hotel. They share an elevator ride and a conversation.

== Cast ==
- Josh Charles as Gary Newman
- Anaïs Demoustier as Audrey Camuzet
- Roschdy Zem as Simon
- Camélia Jordana as Leila
- Geoffrey Cantor as Allan
- Clark Johnson as McCullan
- Akela Sari as Mme Baccar
- Anne Azoulay as Melle Lhomond
- Manuel Vallade as Boris
- Genevieve Adams as Katlyn
- Taklyt Vongdara as Akira
- Radha Mitchell as Elisabeth Newman
- Catherine Ferran as Nuala
- Hippolyte Girardot as Vengers
- Mathieu Amalric as The Narrator
- Philippe Duclos as Audrey's father (voice)
- Kate Moran as Gary's sister (voice)

== Reception ==
On Rotten Tomatoes, the film holds an approval rating of 61% based on 36 reviews, with an average rating of 6.5/10. At Metacritic, the film has a weighted average score of 70 out of 100, based on 12 critics, indicating "generally favourable reviews".
