= Kay Gabriel =

American essayist and poet

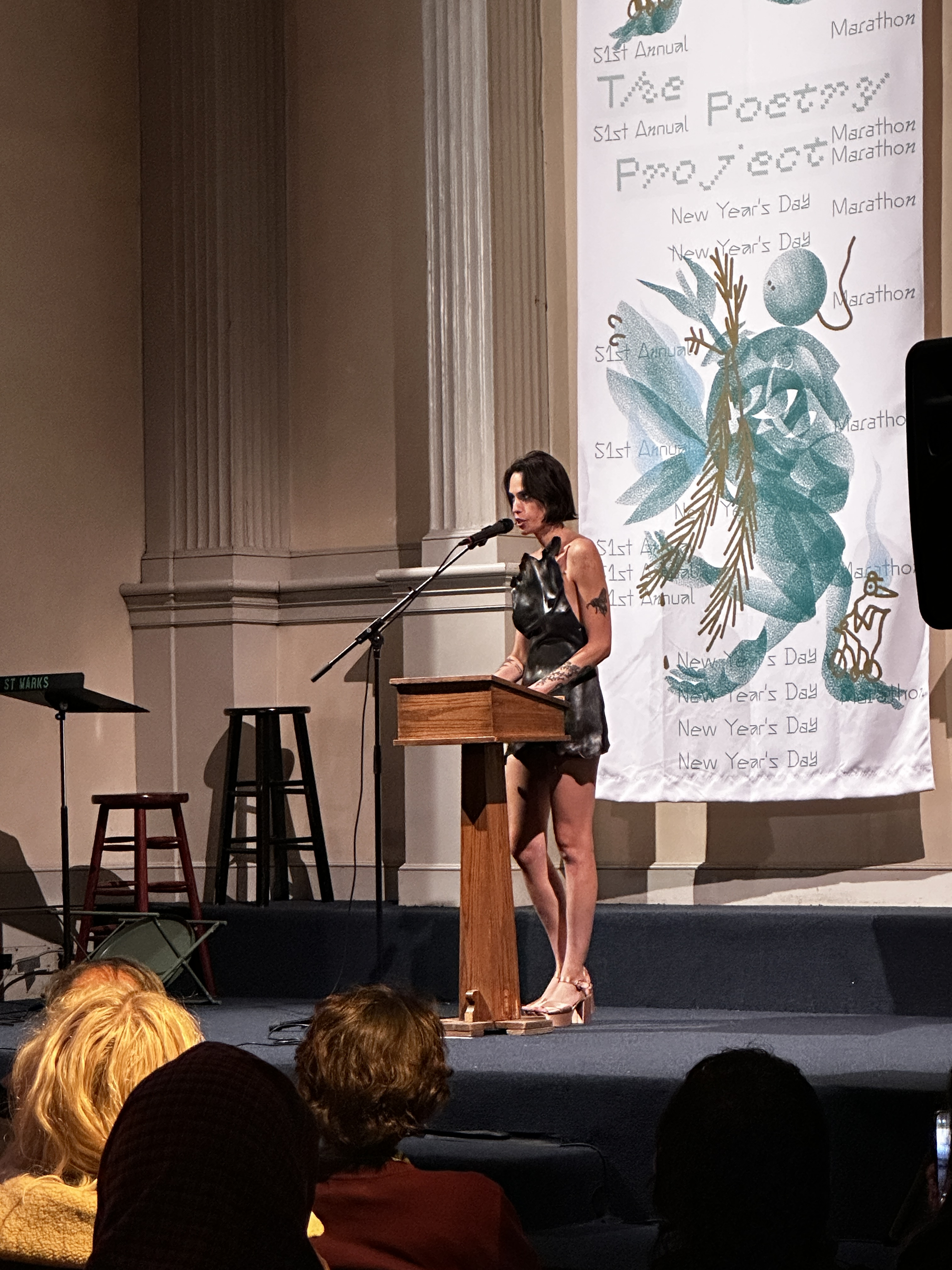
- Kay Gabriel at the Poetry Project's 51st New Year's Day Marathon 2025
- Education: Princeton University
- Occupations: Essayist, poet

Kay Gabriel is an American essayist and poet. She is the author of three books, co-editor of a poetry anthology, and received both a Poetry Project fellowship and the Lambda Literary fellowship. She lives and works in New York. She is married to the producer Seva Granik.

== Work ==
Gabriel graduated from Princeton University with a Ph.D. in classics. According to Gabriel, her scholarly work surveys the intersections of classics and modernist studies. In 2017, Gabriel wrote and published a book titled: Elegy Department Spring / Candy Sonnets 1 through BOAAT Press. She is the recipient of a Poetry Project fellowship and the Lambda Literary fellowship.

In 2019 she joined the editorial collective for the Poetry Project Newsletter, a quarterly publication. She is a co-editor of We Want It All: An Anthology of Radical Trans Poetics with writer Andrea Abi-Karam, published in 2020 by Nightboat Books. Poets featured in the book include Joshua Jennifer Espinoza, Sylvia Rivera, and Leslie Feinberg. The book was a 2021 Lambda Literary Award Finalist. Her writing and poetry has appeared in The Brooklyn Rail, Social Text, and The Believer, among other publications.

Gabriel is the author of several books including Perverts (Nightboat Books, 2025), A Queen in Bucks County (Nightboat Books, 2022) and Kissing Other People or the House of Fame (Nightboat Books, 2023 | Rosa Press, 2021).

Since 2024, Gabriel has been the organizer of Faggots are Women, a queer party series in New York City. The party series has featured performers such as Lauren Flax and Nita Aviance, among others.

== Publications ==
- Fishing and Trapping (Topos Press, 2025)
- Perverts (Nightboat Books, 2025)
- A Queen in Bucks County (Nightboat Books, 2022)
- Kissing Other People or the House of Fame (Rosa Press, 2021)
- We Want It All: An Anthology of Radical Trans Poetics (Nightboat Books, 2020), co-editor
