= Rachel Brosnahan =

American actress (born 1990)

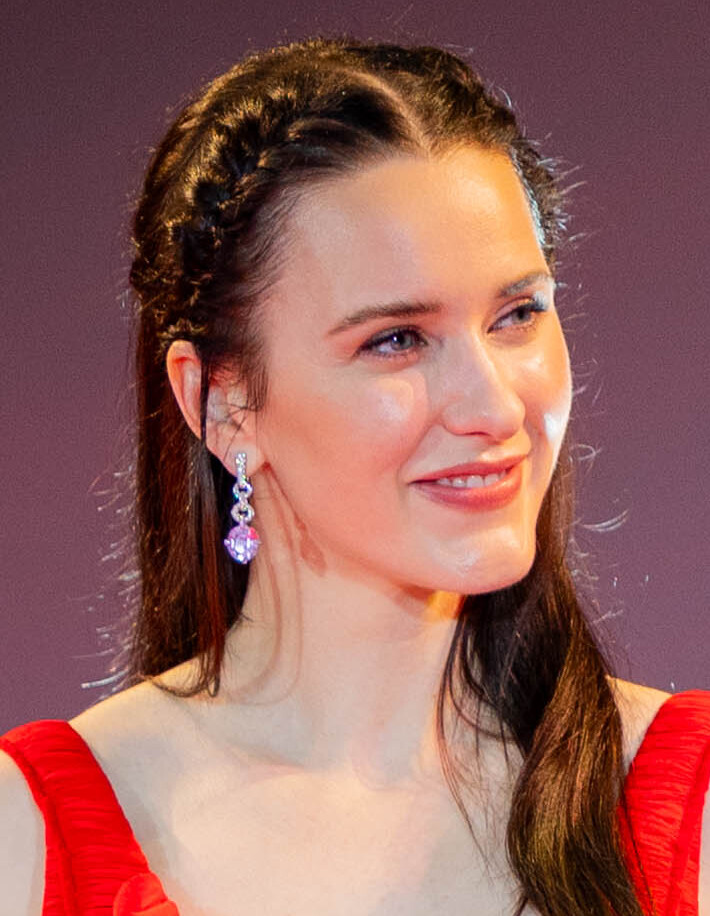
- Brosnahan in 2025
- Born: Rachel Elizabeth Brosnahan; July 12, 1990 (age 36); Milwaukee, Wisconsin, U.S.
- Education: New York University (BFA)
- Occupation: Actress
- Years active: 2007–present
- Spouse: Jason Ralph (m. 2016)
- Relatives: Kate Spade (paternal aunt); Andy Spade (paternal uncle by marriage)

Rachel Elizabeth Brosnahan (born July 12, 1990) is an American actress. She rose to fame for her performance as Midge Maisel in the Amazon Prime Video period comedy series The Marvelous Mrs. Maisel (2017–2023), for which she won a Primetime Emmy Award in 2018 and two consecutive Golden Globe Awards in 2018 and 2019. She is also recognized for portraying Lois Lane in the DC Universe (DCU), a role she first played in the film Superman (2025).

On screen, she was nominated for an Emmy for the political thriller series House of Cards (2013–2015) and acted in the drama series Manhattan (2014–2015) and the comedy miniseries Crisis in Six Scenes (2016). Brosnahan made her film debut in the horror film The Unborn (2009), and had starred in The Courier (2020), I'm Your Woman (2020), and The Amateur (2025).

On stage, she made her Broadway debut in the 2013 revival of the Clifford Odets play The Big Knife. She played Desdemona in the 2016 off Broadway production of Othello, which also starred Daniel Craig and David Oyelowo. Brosnahan returned to Broadway playing a wife in a turbulent marriage in the 2023 revival of the Lorraine Hansberry play The Sign in Sidney Brustein's Window for which she was nominated for the Drama League Distinguished Performance Award.

== Early life and education ==
Brosnahan was born on July 12, 1990, in Milwaukee, Wisconsin, to Carol and Earl Brosnahan, who worked in children's publishing. Her mother is British, and her father is an American of Irish descent. From the age of four years old, Brosnahan was raised in Highland Park, Illinois. She has a younger brother and sister.

She attended Wayne Thomas Elementary School and Northwood Junior High School. She performed in musical theater during junior high and high school. At Highland Park High School, she was on the wrestling team for two years and was a snowboarding instructor. When she was 16, she took a class with Carole Dibo, director of Wilmette's Actors Training Center, who is now her manager. Brosnahan graduated from New York University's Tisch School of the Arts in 2012. She also studied at the Lee Strasberg Theatre and Film Institute.

== Career ==
=== 2009–2016: Rise to prominence ===
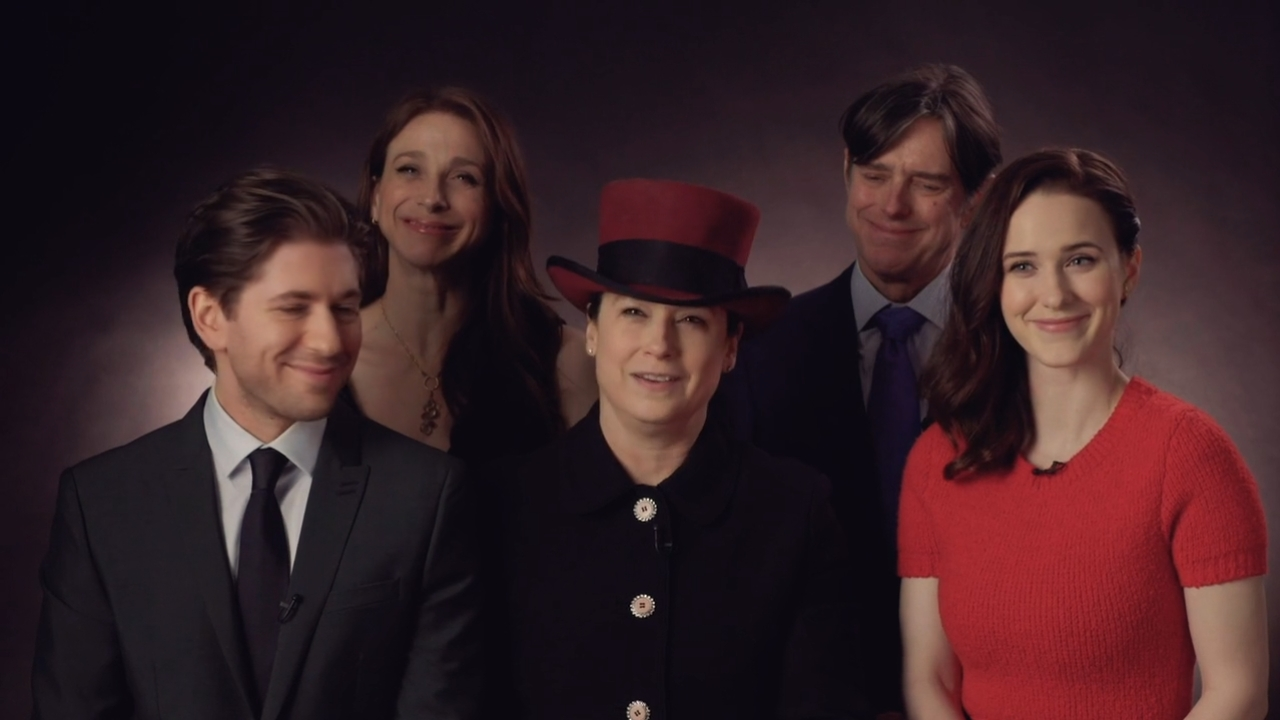
Cast members and producers of The Marvelous Mrs. Maisel in 2018

While still in high school, Brosnahan received her first movie role—that of Lisa in the Michael Bay-produced horror film The Unborn (2009). She first appeared on stage in 2009 in Up at Steppenwolf Theatre. In college, she appeared in single episodes of television series such as Gossip Girl, The Good Wife, Grey's Anatomy, and In Treatment. Brosnahan's early roles include performances in two short films directed by Ari Aster, Basically (2013), and Munchausen (2014). After college, she began landing recurring roles in series such as the crime thriller The Blacklist (2014) and the short-lived medical drama Black Box (2014). She made her Broadway debut in The Big Knife with Roundabout Theatre Company in 2013.

In 2013, she starred as Rachel Posner in the critically acclaimed Netflix political drama House of Cards with Kevin Spacey and Robin Wright. Although she was initially booked for only two episodes, she caught the eye of showrunner Beau Willimon, and her character was significantly expanded. Her role brought her career prominence, and she received a Primetime Emmy Award nomination for Outstanding Guest Actress in a Drama Series at the 67th Primetime Emmy Awards. From 2014 to 2015, she starred in period drama series Manhattan. In 2016, she played Desdemona in Othello at New York Theatre Workshop opposite David Oyelowo and Daniel Craig, and appeared in Woody Allen's Amazon original series, Crisis in Six Scenes, with Allen, Elaine May and Miley Cyrus.

=== 2017–2023: The Marvelous Mrs. Maisel ===
Starting in 2017, Brosnahan appeared as the title character in Amy Sherman-Palladino's period comedy Amazon original series, The Marvelous Mrs. Maisel. She has said that her exposure to Jewish culture growing up helped prepare her for the role of Midge Maisel, a 1950s Jewish housewife who pursues a career in stand-up comedy when her marriage fails. Her performance has earned her a Primetime Emmy Award for Outstanding Lead Actress in a Comedy Series, two Golden Globe Awards, three Screen Actors Guild Awards, and two Critics' Choice Television Awards, among other accolades. In 2019, Brosnahan launched the production company Scrap Paper Pictures.

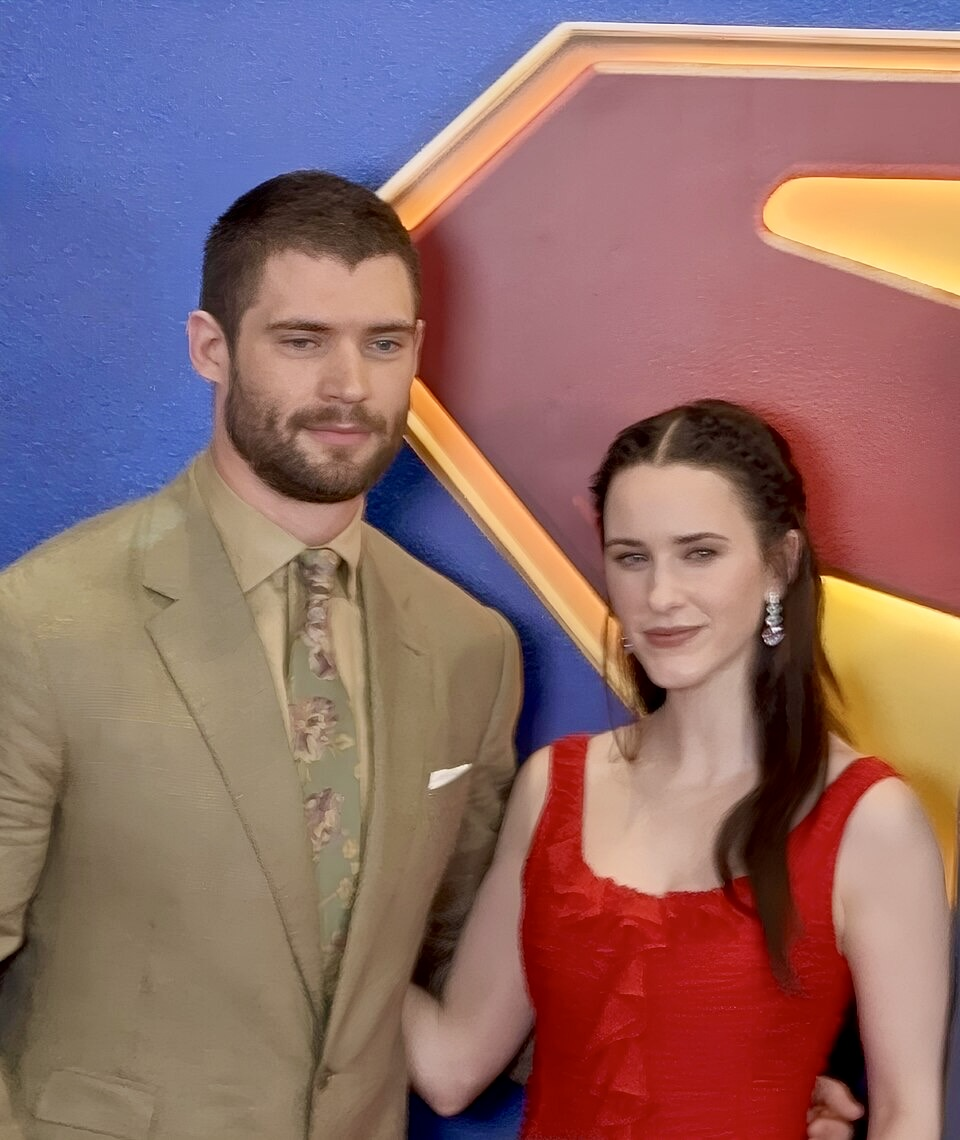
Brosnahan (right) with co-star David Corenswet at the premiere of Superman in Manila (2025)

Brosnahan appeared in the historical spy drama film The Courier with Benedict Cumberbatch, released in January 2020. In December 2020, Amazon released I'm Your Woman, in which she starred with Arinzé Kene and produced. Sheri Linden of The Hollywood Reporter praised her performance writing, "The film gives Brosnahan’s fans a chance to see her in a far more internalized, watchful mode than on her Amazon series, and there isn’t a performance here that hits a wrong note". In 2022, she starred in the western Dead for a Dollar which premiered at the 79th Venice International Film Festival. Variety described her performance as having "fierce crispness" and IndieWire asserted that "She serves up extra chutzpah with every gesture".

In 2023, she starred in the revival of Lorraine Hansberry's The Sign in Sidney Brustein's Window opposite Oscar Isaac first at the Brooklyn Academy of Music, and later produced at the James Earl Jones Theatre on Broadway directed by Anne Kauffman. She received positive reviews for her performance with Laura Collins-Hughes of The New York Times writing that Brosnahan plays the role "with a fragile strength and perfect comic timing". For her performance she was nominated for the Drama League Award for Outstanding Distinguished Performer.

=== 2024–present ===
In 2025, Brosnahan appeared as Lois Lane in the DC Universe superhero film Superman, from director James Gunn. She also played the wife of a CIA analyst in the espionage action thriller The Amateur starring Rami Malek. Also that year, it was announced that Brosnahan would be cast in the lead in the Apple TV+ anthology crime drama series Presumed Innocent which she will also serve as an executive producer.

== Personal life ==
It was reported in 2018 that Brosnahan had married actor Jason Ralph, but she later revealed in January 2019 that they had been married "for years" before their relationship became public. Both attended the 76th Golden Globe Awards ceremony in 2019, where she thanked him during her award acceptance speech.

Brosnahan is the niece of handbag designer Kate Spade (born Katherine Noel Brosnahan), who was married to Andy Spade, the older brother of actor and comedian David Spade.

Brosnahan has twice completed the "Live Below the Line" challenge.

== Acting credits ==
Key
†	Denotes films that have not yet been released

=== Film ===
Year	Work	Role	Notes
2009	The Unborn	Lisa	
2009	The Truth About Average Guys	Molly	
2011	Coming Up Roses	Alice	
2012	Nor'easter	Abby Green	
2012	Adrift	Alex	Short film
2013	Beautiful Creatures	Genevieve Duchannes	
2013	Care	Drea	Short film
2013	A New York Heartbeat	Tamara	
2013	Munchausen	Girl	Short film
2014	Basically	Shandy	Short film
2014	I'm Obsessed with You	Nell Fitzpatrick	
2014	The Smut Locker	Jamie White	Short film
2015	James White	Ellen	
2015	Louder Than Bombs	Erin	
2016	The Finest Hours	Bea Hansen	
2016	Burn Country	Sandra	
2016	Patriots Day	Jessica Kensky	
2017	Boomtown	Jamie	
2018	Fifteen Years Later	Amy	Short film
2018	Change in the Air	Wren	
2019	Spies in Disguise	Wendy Beckett	Voice role
2020	The Courier	Emily Donovan	
2020	I'm Your Woman	Jean	Also produced
2022	Dead for a Dollar	Rachel Kidd	
2025	The Amateur	Sarah Heller	
2025	Superman	Lois Lane	
2027	Saturn Return †		Post-production
2027	Man of Tomorrow †	Lois Lane	Post-production
TBA	Lear Rex †	Regan	Post-production

=== Television ===
Year	Work	Role	Notes
2010	Mercy	Samantha	Episode: "We're All Adults"
2010	Gossip Girl	Girl	Episode: "It's a Dad, Dad, Dad, Dad World"
2010	The Good Wife	Caitlin Fenton	Episode: "Poisoned Pill"
2010	In Treatment	Eating Disorder Girl	Episode: "Jesse: Week Six"
2011	CSI: Miami	Melanie Garland	Episode: "Countermeasures"
2013	Grey's Anatomy	Brian Weston	Episode: "The Face of Change"
2013	Orange Is the New Black	Little Allie	Episode: "Bora Bora Bora"
2013–2015	House of Cards	Rachel Posner	Main cast (19 episodes)
2014	Olive Kitteridge	Patty Howe	Episode: "Incoming Tide"
2014	The Blacklist	Jolene Parker / Lucy Brooks	6 episodes
2014	Black Box	Delilah Buchanan	5 episodes
2014–2015	Manhattan	Abby Isaacs	Main cast (23 episodes)
2015	The Dovekeepers	Yael	2 episodes
2016	Crisis in Six Scenes	Ellie	Main cast (4 episodes)
2017–2023	The Marvelous Mrs. Maisel	Miriam "Midge" Maisel	Main cast (43 episodes)
2019	Saturday Night Live	Herself (host)	Episode: "Rachel Brosnahan/Greta Van Fleet"
2019–2020	Elena of Avalor	Princess Chloe (voice)	3 episodes
2020	50 States of Fright	Heather	3 episodes
2020	Saturday Night Seder	Herself	Television special
2020–2021	Yearly Departed	Herself	2 episodes
2021	Ziwe	Herself	Episode: "Allyship"
TBA	Presumed Innocent	Leila Reynolds	Main role (season 2); also Executive producer

=== Theatre ===
Year	Title	Role	Venue	Ref.
2009	Up	Maria	Steppenwolf Theatre Company	
2013	The Big Knife	Dixie Evans	Roundabout Theatre Company	
2016	Othello	Desdemona	New York Theatre Workshop	
2023	The Sign in Sidney Brustein's Window	Iris Parodus Brustein	Brooklyn Academy of Music	
2023	The Sign in Sidney Brustein's Window	Iris Parodus Brustein	James Earl Jones Theatre	
2024	Gutenberg! The Musical!	Producer (one night only)	James Earl Jones Theatre	

== Awards and nominations ==
Organizations	Year	Category	Work	Result	Ref.
Critics' Choice Television Awards	2017	Best Actress in a Comedy Series	The Marvelous Mrs. Maisel	Won	
Critics' Choice Television Awards	2018	Best Actress in a Comedy Series	The Marvelous Mrs. Maisel	Won	
Critics' Choice Television Awards	2019	Best Actress in a Comedy Series	The Marvelous Mrs. Maisel	Nominated	
Critics' Choice Television Awards	2023	Best Actress in a Comedy Series	The Marvelous Mrs. Maisel	Nominated	
Critics' Choice Super Awards	2026	Best Actress in a Superhero Movie	Superman	Nominated	
Drama League Award	2023	Distinguished Performance	The Sign in Sidney Brustein's Window	Nominated	
Golden Globe Awards	2017	Best Actress in a Musical/Comedy Series	The Marvelous Mrs. Maisel	Won	
Golden Globe Awards	2018	Best Actress in a Musical/Comedy Series	The Marvelous Mrs. Maisel	Won	
Golden Globe Awards	2019	Best Actress in a Musical/Comedy Series	The Marvelous Mrs. Maisel	Nominated	
Golden Globe Awards	2023	Best Actress in a Musical/Comedy Series	The Marvelous Mrs. Maisel	Nominated	
Primetime Emmy Awards	2015	Outstanding Guest Actress in a Drama Series	House of Cards (episode: "Chapter 39")	Nominated	
Primetime Emmy Awards	2018	Outstanding Lead Actress in a Comedy Series	The Marvelous Mrs. Maisel (episode: "Thank You and Good Night")	Won	
Primetime Emmy Awards	2019	Outstanding Lead Actress in a Comedy Series	The Marvelous Mrs. Maisel (episode: "Midnight at the Concord")	Nominated	
Primetime Emmy Awards	2020	Outstanding Lead Actress in a Comedy Series	The Marvelous Mrs. Maisel (episode: "A Jewish Girl Walks Into the Apollo...")	Nominated	
Primetime Emmy Awards	2022	Outstanding Lead Actress in a Comedy Series	The Marvelous Mrs. Maisel (episode: "How Do You Get to Carnegie Hall?")	Nominated	
Primetime Emmy Awards	2023	Outstanding Lead Actress in a Comedy Series	The Marvelous Mrs. Maisel (episode: "Four Minutes")	Nominated	
Screen Actors Guild Awards	2015	Outstanding Ensemble in a Drama Series	House of Cards	Nominated	
Screen Actors Guild Awards	2018	Outstanding Ensemble in a Comedy Series	The Marvelous Mrs. Maisel	Won	
Screen Actors Guild Awards	2018	Outstanding Actress in a Comedy Series	The Marvelous Mrs. Maisel	Won	
Screen Actors Guild Awards	2019	Outstanding Ensemble in a Comedy Series	The Marvelous Mrs. Maisel	Won	
Screen Actors Guild Awards	2019	Outstanding Actress in a Comedy Series	The Marvelous Mrs. Maisel	Nominated	
Screen Actors Guild Awards	2022	Outstanding Actress in a Comedy Series	The Marvelous Mrs. Maisel	Nominated	
Screen Actors Guild Awards	2023	Outstanding Actress in a Comedy Series	The Marvelous Mrs. Maisel	Nominated	
Television Critics Association Awards	2018	Individual Achievement in Comedy	The Marvelous Mrs. Maisel	Won	
