= Ladyfag =

Canadian-American writer and performer

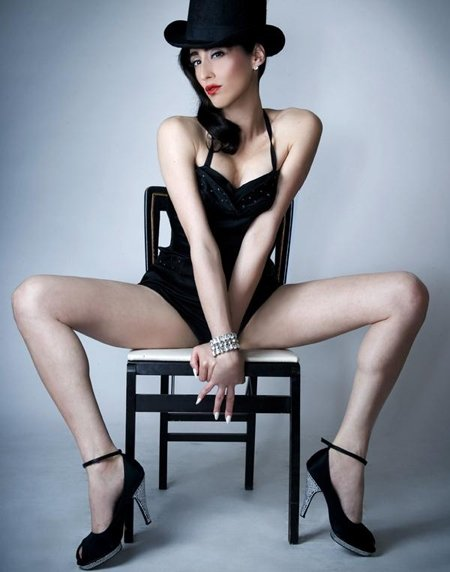
- Born: Rayne Baron; September 11, 1976 (age 49); Toronto, Canada
- Occupations: Writer, performer, nightlife personality
- Years active: 2006–present
- Partner: Skin
- Children: 1
- Website: ladyfag.com

Rayne Baron, known professionally as Ladyfag, is a New York City-based writer, performer, nightlife personality, and events producer.

== Background ==
Born in Toronto, Canada, she ran a store selling vintage clothing and antiques. After becoming involved in the Toronto club scene, she was a resident performer at Will Munro's Vazaleen parties. Canadian writer R. M. Vaughan in his article 'Generation V', about gay and lesbians revolutionizing the city's underground art scene says, "a statuesque model and vintage clothing dealer who dominated the stage like a Russian Jewish Grace Jones."

In 2006, she relocated to New York City assuming the name Ladyfag, and was discovered by NYC nightlife icon Kenny Kenny and started dancing at the famed party "Happy Valley" thrown by him and Susanne Bartsch. She has since become her own events producer, known for holding parties for the downtown, underground and international fashion scene.

== Nightlife and events ==
In the spring of 2010, she started East Village based party Family Function with her resident DJ and friend Michael Magnan. In the fall of 2010 she produced the now infamous Clubber Down Disco party with resident DJ Miss Honey Dijon. It was one of the last of the parties at the legendary Hotel Chelsea before it was sold in the summer of 2011. Clothing store Opening Ceremony selected the party as one of the top six of the decade, and had her help host their 10-year anniversary celebration at Webster Hall.

In 2013 she and Seva Granik started producing a series of secret warehouse parties in Brooklyn called Shade, which have become a nightlife phenomenon.

For a party celebrating the launch of Maurizio Cattelan and Pierpaolo Ferrari's Toilet Paper magazine and the unveiling of their billboard on the High Line, she produced an evening at the famed leather bar The Eagle. In 2012, she co-emceed with Legendary Vogue Ball MC Jack Mizrahi at the AmfAR and the W Hotel's inaugural Love Hangover Ball fundraiser event. The event was hosted by Kelly Osbourne, and included judges and presenters such as Edward Enninful, Fergie, Mickey Boardman, Pat McGrath, Simon Doonan, Karlie Kloss, Isaac Mizrahi, Lily Donaldson, Zac Posen, Derek Blasberg, Richard Chai and Jason Wu.

In the 2010s, she organized the popular daytime bazaar, Pop Souk, a one-day market place and party with the tagline "where downtown sells, not sells out". The event was a biannual tradition, taking place with fall and spring editions at such venues as the Hiro Ballroom, Greenhouse, and the Standard Highline.

Also in the 2010s, her and producer Josh Wood threw a popular party called Pacino during men's fashion week in Paris every season. She has produced events at Art Basel in Miami, as well as at the Life Ball party in Vienna raising money for HIV and AIDS research.

In 2018, Ladyfag launched the LadyLand music festival, described by Billboard as “equal parts Coachella, Berlin nightclub, and queer warehouse rave.” Past performers include SOPHIE, Honey Dijon, Christina Aguilera, Peaches, Tinashe, Arca, and Danny Tenaglia.

Battle Hymn is a recurring house music party for in New York City, established in 2016, featuring resident and guest DJs and held at various venues throughout the city. Founded and curated by Ladyfag, the event has been described as an institution.

She was voted Most Welcome Party Presence in the "Best of New York City 2009" by The Village Voice, as well as named Queen of the Scene by New York Press. In 2007, Paper magazine featured her in their annual Beautiful People issue and in 2009 presented her with the Future Face of Nightlife award at their Nightlife Awards.

== Art ==
For an art exhibit curated by Sook-Yin Lee, she wrote and performed a cabaret act entitled "Ladyfag, A Love Story". Her collaboration with artist Paige Gratland on the "Donut Ho's" exhibitions lead to a multimedia piece being acquired by the National Gallery of Canada's "Library Collection". She was selected by the Gladstone Hotel to design one of their artist commissioned rooms.

In late 2006, she returned to Toronto for a nearly sold-out multimedia solo show at Paul Petro Multiples and Small Works gallery entitled "Ladyfag: Saint of Female Faggotry."

In 2011, she was awarded the FUN Fellowship in the Social Practice of Nightlife by the Museum of Arts and Design. She also acted as a key speaker about nightlife at MAD's "Nightlife: An Oral History of NYC Club Culture" program.

She was invited to be the key speaker at the opening night gala of the show "Frida & Diego: Passion, Politics and Painting" at the Art Gallery Ontario.

== Additional projects ==
Ladyfag has been featured in numerous ad campaigns, including for Marc Jacobs, Bulldog Gin, and Cafeteria. She has appeared in music videos for artists such as The Ones and Cazwell, short films like Sephora's "Cherchez La Femme" to promote its Film Noir Fall 2009 collection, and in the "There Is No Tomorrow" ad for Built featured in the Tribeca Film Festival. She was featured in a video for the art publication Toilet Paper done in collaboration with art studio Kreemart.

She has been shot for fashion editorials in publications such as Document Journal, V, Hercules, BlackBook, Love, Rolling Stone Russia, Dutch, Candy, New York Times, Hunter, Interview, Out, Hunter and Cook, and Visionare, and has worked with photographers Inez and Vinoodh, Paola Kudacki, Juergen Teller, Patrick Demarchelier, Mariano Vivanco, Bruce LaBruce, Ellen von Unwerth, Terry Tsiolis, and Laurence Ellis.

Professional credits include producing, co-producing, and creative direction for afterparties of fashion houses and brands including Marc Jacobs, Givenchy, Burberry, Diesel, Calvin Klein, Dsquared2, and Valentino.

From 2010 to 2020, she was a regular contributor to Paper magazine, Candy magazine, and 25 magazine.

In 2025, she produced her first play, Jacob Wasson's Smuta, at a club in Brooklyn. "We always say in nightlife, you have a bunch of problems—and if you solve them, you have a party," she said. "It's the same thing in theater."

== Personal life ==
Ladyfag lives in New York and London with her partner Skin, to whom she was engaged in 2020, and their daughter.
