= Pascale Ferran =

French film director and screenwriter

- Born: 17 April 1960 (age 66); Paris, France
- Occupations: Film director, screenwriter
- Years active: 1983–present
- Parent: Jacques Ferran (father)

Pascale Ferran (French: [fɛʁɑ̃]; born 17 April 1960) is a French film director and screenwriter. In 2007, her film Lady Chatterley won five César Awards including Best Film, Best Cinematography and Best Adaptation. Her 2014 film Bird People was selected to compete in the Un Certain Regard section at the 2014 Cannes Film Festival. Ferran also wrote the screenplay for The Red Turtle, an animated film by Michael Dudok de Wit, that competed in the Hawaii International Film Festival on 12 November 2016.

== Early life ==
Pascale Ferran was born on April 17, 1960, in Paris, France. Her father was sports journalist Jacques Ferran. From a young age she was involved in cinema, operating the film club at her high school. From 1980 to 1983 she attended IDHEC, which is now known as the prestigious La Fémis.

== Career ==
=== Directing and Screenwriting ===
Ferran helped to write the documentary Mange ta soupe by Mathieu Amalric, which was released in 1997. Shortly after, in 1998, Ferran wrote, filmed, and directed Quatre jours à Ocoee', a documentary about a jazz music record. Released in 2000, this documentary was filmed in Florida. Around this time Ferran also wrote Paratonerre which, due to funding, has never been released. In 1999 Ferran directed a film dubbing of Stanley Kubrick's 1999 film Eyes Wide Shut.

=== Film Festivals ===
As a director and screenwriter, Ferran has also participated in a number of film festivals. She showed a new film at the 4th annual French Film Festival UK in 1996 and, in 1997 at the 5th annual festival, presented Coming to Terms with the Dead with Pierre Trividic. In June 2014 Ferran also participated in the 12th Brussels Film Festival.

==== Cannes Film Festival ====
From 1990 to the present, Ferran has had a steady presence at the Cannes Film Festival. Her involvement in works that were screened at Cannes include:

- 1990 directed The Kiss
- 1992 credited as co-screenwriter for Arnaud Desplechin's The Sentinel
- 1994 directed Coming to Terms with the Dead in the Cinémas en France category of the Cannes Film Festival and won the Caméra d'Or Award.
- 2007 selected as the president and chair of the Un Certain Regard jury at the 60th annual Cannes Film Festival.
- 2014 directed and wrote the screenplay for Bird People, which was selected to compete in the Un Certain Regard section of the festival.

== Awards ==
Ferran's critically acclaimed adaptation of Lady Chatterley's Lover won the Prix Louis-Delluc award and five César awards for Best Film, Adaptation, Photography, Actress, and Costumes.

== Influences ==
Ferran is a sought-after lecturer. As early as 2007, as part of the Angers Workshops, she has taught master classes on directing, screenwriting, and filmmaking in general. On September 7, 2014, she taught a master class at Alliance Française in Toronto, Ontario titled "Gravity and Grace". A segment of this film festival was actually dedicated as a "Tribute to Pascale Ferran". Also in 2014, as part of the Carte Noire IFI French Film Festival and under the category "French Fest", Ferran taught a master class titled "Literary Adaptation and Visual Effects". This collaborative effort by the French Embassy in Dublin and the Irish Film Institute also featured notable guests such as Mathieu Amalric, Assa Sylla, and Antoine de Baecque.

On March 19, 2016, at the 38th International Festival of Women's Films, Ferran and composer Béatrice Thiriet presented a master class together. The two women have collaborated previously on multiple projects, most recently Bird People in 2014 and Lady Chatterley in 2006.

Ferran is also, as of 2016, on the board of directors of SRF, or La Société des Réalisateurs de Films.

== Personal life ==
In 2002 Ferran appeared, as herself, in Romain Goupil's documentary Une Pure Coïncidence.

To date, Ferran is politically conscious and frequently defending and advocating for workers' rights in the film industry, as well as the rights of illegal immigrants. She was in Calais, France in August 2016 when a group of migrants attacked vehicles and wrote to testify on behalf of the migrants.

Ferran co-founded LaCinetek in 2015, alongside directors Laurent Cantet and Cédric Klapisch.

== Filmography ==
Year	Film	Credited as		Notes
Year	Film	Director	Screenwriter	Notes
1980	Anvers	Yes	Yes	Short film; co-screenwriter
1983	Souvenir de Juan-Les-Pins	Yes	Yes	Short film; co-screenwriter
1983	Il ne faut jurer de rien		Yes	Short film
1986	Guardian of the Night		Yes	
1989	Blancs cassés		Yes	
1989	Les Cinéphiles 2 - Eric a disparu		Yes	
1989	Un dîner avec M. Boy et la femme qui aime Jésus	Yes	Yes	Short film; co-screenwriter/dialogist
1990	The Kiss (Le Baiser)	Yes	Yes	Short film; co-screenwriter Nominated—Short Film Palme d'Or
1992	The Sentinel		Yes	
1994	Coming to Terms with the Dead (Petits Arrangements avec les Morts)	Yes	Yes	Co-screenwriter/dialogist Bayard d'Or for Best Film Winner–Caméra d'or Award, Cannes Film Festival, 1994; Nominated—César Award for Best First Feature Film
1996	The Age of Possibilities (L'Âge des Possibles)	Yes	Yes	Co-screenwriter/dialogist 7 d'Or for Best Director - Fiction; 7 d'Or for Best Telefilm Winner–Fipresci Award, Venice Film Festival
1997	Mange ta soupe		Yes	
2000	Quatre jours à Ocoee	Yes	Yes	Documentary filmed in 1998
2006	Lady Chatterley	Yes	Yes	Co-screenwriter/ adaptor/dialogist Winner–César Award for Best Film; Winner–César Award for Best Adaptation (shared with Roger Bohbot and Pierre Trividic); Winner–Louis Delluc Prize; Winner–Lumière Award for Best Director; Nominated—César Award for Best Director; Nominated—Lumière Award for Best Film
2014	Bird People	Yes	Yes	Nominated—Louis Delluc Prize Nominated–César Award for Best Music, 2015 Nominated–César Award for Best Sound, 2015 Co-screenwriter/adaptor/dialogist
2016	The Red Turtle		Yes	Co-screenwriter
