= Manish Dayal =

American actor (born 1983)

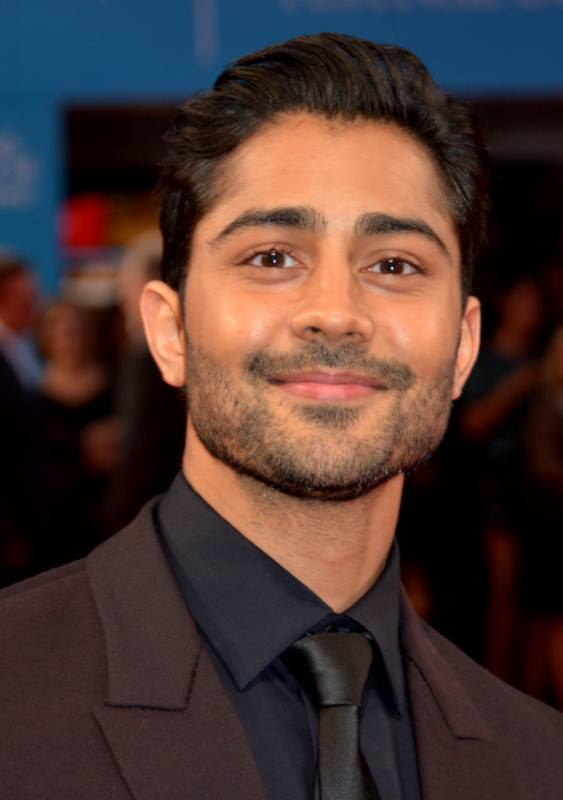
- Dayal at the Deauville film festival
- Born: Manish Sudhir Patel; June 17, 1983 (age 43); Orangeburg, South Carolina, U.S.
- Occupation: Actor
- Years active: 2005–present
- Spouse: Snehal Patel
- Children: 2

Manish Sudhir Patel, known as Manish Dayal is an American actor. He is best known for his roles in the CW teen drama series 90210 (2011–2012) as well as in the films The Hundred Foot Journey (2014) and Viceroy's House (2017). From 2018 to 2023, he was featured as a main cast member of the Fox medical drama series The Resident.

== Early and personal life ==
Dayal was born to an Indian family in Orangeburg, South Carolina. His parents, Hema and Sudhir Patel, are from Gujarat, India. He has three sisters. He uses his grandfather's first name, Dayal, as his stage surname. He would complete a 2005 degree in International Business at George Washington University and moved to New York to pursue an acting career. Five years later he moved to Los Angeles.

== Career ==
Dayal started his career appearing in national commercials for McDonald's, Windows, Nintendo, and Domino's Pizza. In 2008, he played the lead in The New Group's twice-extended off-Broadway show Rafta, Rafta. He also voiced Mohammed, a taxi driver in Rockstar Games's critically acclaimed video game Grand Theft Auto IV. He played a small role in The Sorcerer's Apprentice and Paula van der Oest's Domino Effect. After guest-starring on CSI: Crime Scene Investigation on CBS, Dayal went on to play Hal, a code-breaking computer analyst, on the AMC series Rubicon. Dayal also starred in the romantic comedy Walkaway, which explores love and culture set in New York. In 2010 and 2011, he played Ravi, the smug A-team leader on Outsourced, a comedy series from NBC. He also played Raj Kher, an alternative college student recovering from cancer, in the third and fourth seasons of The CW's 90210.

He starred as Hassan Kadam in The Hundred Foot Journey (2014). From 2018 to 2023, he starred in the Fox TV series The Resident.

== Filmography ==
=== Film ===
Year	Title	Role	Notes
2006	Break the Addiction: An Inconvenient Truth	Kibhnar	
2008	On the Other Side	Jayakrishna "Jack"	
2008	Cain's Mark	Gypsy	
2009	Karma Calling	Trainee	
2010	The Sorcerer's Apprentice	NYU clerk	
2010	Walkaway	Vinay	
2011	The Call	Taruk	
2011	The Domino Effect	Sid	
2011	The Whirling Dervish	Zahir	
2012	White Frog	Ajit	
2012	Breaking the Girls	Tim	
2014	The Hundred-Foot Journey	Hassan Kadam	
2014	I'm Obsessed with You (But You've Got to Leave Me Alone)	Cyrus Kapoor	
2017	Viceroy's House	Jeet Kumar	
2020	Holidate	Faarooq	
2022	Rise	Kevin	

=== Television ===
Year	Title	Role	Notes
2010	Rubicon	Hal	3 episodes
2010	Outsourced	Ravi	Episode: "Jolly Vindaloo Day"
2010	CSI: Crime Scene Investigation	Rishi Parayan	Episode: "Internal Combustion"
2011	Law & Order: Criminal Intent	Samir Doss	Episode: "To the Boy in the Blue Knit Cap"
2011–2012	90210	Raj Kher	14 episodes
2012	Switched at Birth	Scuba	4 episodes
2012	The Good Wife	Dinesh	Episode: "Live from Damascus"
2014	Law & Order: Special Victims Unit	Farid Salim	Episode: "Criminal Stories"
2016	Halt and Catch Fire	Ryan Ray	8 episodes
2016–2017	Agents of S.H.I.E.L.D.	Vijay Nadeer	3 episodes
2018–2023	The Resident	Dr. Devon Pravesh	Main cast; Director: 2 episodes
2019–2021	Fast & Furious: Spy Racers	Shashi Dhar (voice)	Main role (season 1 and 5), Netflix series
2024	The Walking Dead: Daryl Dixon	Ash Patel	4 episodes
2025	Chicago Med	Dr. Theo Rabari	8 episodes

=== Video games ===
Year	Title	Role	Notes
2008	Grand Theft Auto IV	Mohammed/Hot dog Vendor	
2009	Grand Theft Auto: Chinatown Wars	Hot dog Vendor	Uncredited
2011	Star Wars: The Old Republic	Additional voices	
2021	Fast & Furious Spy Racers: Rise of SH1FT3R	Shashi Dhar	
