= Thomas McDonell =

American actor

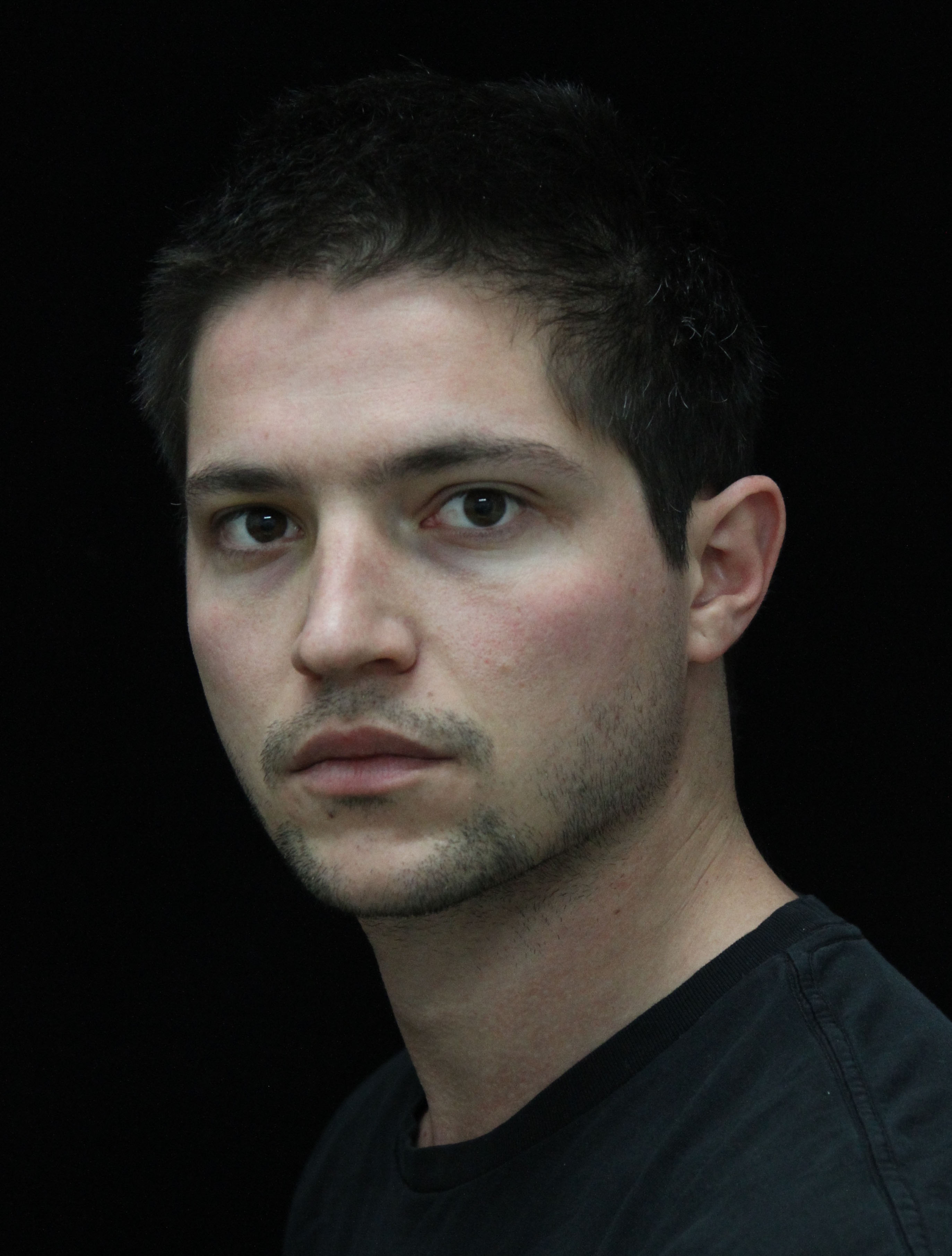
- McDonell in 2017
- Born: Thomas Hunter Campbell McDonell; May 2, 1986 (age 40); Manhattan, New York, U.S.
- Occupations: Actor, artist
- Years active: 2008–present
- Partner: Jane Levy (2011–present)
- Children: 1
- Relatives: Terry McDonell (father); Nick McDonell (brother)

Thomas Hunter Campbell McDonell (born May 2, 1986) is an American actor and artist. He is known for his role as Finn Collins on the CW post-apocalyptic series The 100.

== Early life ==
McDonell was born and raised in Manhattan, New York, and attended boarding school in Andover, Massachusetts. He graduated from New York University. His mother, Joanie, who is of Jewish descent, is a writer, and his father, Terry McDonell, is editor of Sports Illustrated. His brother is writer Nick McDonell.

== Career ==
McDonell starred as Finn Collins in the post-apocalyptic show The 100. He also played a role in The Forbidden Kingdom, and in Twelve. McDonell played the main role in 2011 teen film Prom as Jesse Richter. He has guest-starred in Suburgatory as Scott Strauss, Tessa's boyfriend. He is the lead singer and guitarist for the band Moon.

As a visual artist, McDonell has exhibited his own work internationally, and has curated several exhibitions including a tunnel exhibit at the historic Southwest Museum site in Los Angeles, a video art show at a Best Buy in New York, and a monochrome painting exhibition at the ArcLight Hollywood movie theater complex. His conceptual fashion editorials and photographs have been published in print and online in magazines including the Marfa Journal, Buffalo Zine, Teen Vogue, and F Magazine.

== Personal life ==
Since 2011, McDonell has been in a relationship with actress Jane Levy. In June 2024, the couple revealed that they were expecting their first child. They have a son named Desmond, born in 2024.

== Filmography ==
=== Film ===
Year	Title	Roles	Notes
2008	The Forbidden Kingdom	Young Southie	
2010	Twelve	Kid in plaid tie	
2011	Prom	Jesse Richter	
2012	Fun Size	Aaron Riley	
2014	Where the Devil Hides	Trevor	
2014	I'm Obsessed with You	Freddie Diaz	
2014	10 Things I Hate About Life	Ben	Unfinished and unreleased
2021	A Show-Stopping Christmas	Sam	
2022	Simchas and Sorrows	Levi	

=== Television ===
Year	Title	Roles	Notes
2010	Law & Order: Criminal Intent	Eddie Boyle	Episode: "Broad Channel"
2012–2013	Suburgatory	Scott Strauss	Recurring role (season 1-2)
2014–2015	The 100	Finn Collins	Main cast (seasons 1–2)
2017	The Long Road Home	Carl Wild	Recurring role (season 1)
2018	LA to Vegas	Justin	Episode: "Things to Do in Vegas When You're Grounded"
2018	Good Girls	Brian	Episode: "Taking Care of Business"
2021	Zoey's Extraordinary Playlist	Barnaby Steele	Episode: "Zoey's Extraordinary Mystery"

=== Music videos ===
Year	Title	Artist	Role	Notes	Ref.
2011	"Your Surrender" (Prom version)	Neon Trees	Jesse Richter		
2011	"Time Stand"	Moon	—N/a	Also director	
2012	"This Kiss"	Carly Rae Jepsen	Love Interest		
