= In the Dark (American TV series) =

2019 American television series

- Genre: Police procedural Crime
- Created by: Corinne Kingsbury
- Starring: Perry Mattfeld; Rich Sommer; Brooke Markham; Casey Deidrick; Keston John; Morgan Krantz; Thamela Mpumlwana; Derek Webster; Kathleen York; Theodore Bhat; Matt Murray; Marianne Rendón
- Composers: Will Blair; Brooke Blair; Will Bates; Jeff Russo; The Newton Brothers
- Country of origin: United States
- Original language: English
- No. of seasons: 4
- No. of episodes: 52

Production
- Executive producers: Ben Stiller; Nicky Weinstock; Corinne Kingsbury; Jackie Cohn; Michael Showalter; John Weber; Frank Siracusa; Andrea Raffaghello
- Producers: Amy Turner; Adrian Cruz; Jeff J.J. Authors; Perry Mattfeld
- Cinematography: Brian Burgoyne; Bradford Lipson; Onno Weeda
- Editors: Jessica Brunetto; Tod Modisett; Gregory Cusumano; Warren Bowman; Bari Winter; Josiah Ruis; Lois Blumenthal; David Grecu; Dana Sullivan; Ciarán Michael Vejby
- Running time: 42 minutes
- Production companies: Red Hour Films; Warner Bros. Television Studios (Note: Credited as Warner Bros. Television); CBS Studios (Note: Credited as CBS Television Studios for seasons 1–2)

Original release
- Network: The CW
- Release: April 4, 2019 – September 5, 2022

In the Dark is an American crime drama television series, created by Corinne Kingsbury for The CW, which debuted as a mid-season entry during the 2018–19 television season.

On January 30, 2018, The CW ordered the show to pilot, with Michael Showalter set to direct. In May 2018, the show received a series order. The series premiered on April 4, 2019. In April 2019, the series was renewed for a second season that premiered on April 16, 2020. In January 2020, The CW renewed the series for a third season which premiered on June 23, 2021. In February 2021, the series was renewed for a fourth season which premiered on June 6, 2022. In May 2022, it was announced that the fourth season would be its last. The show ended its run on September 5, 2022.

== Premise ==
An irreverent blind woman in her twenties, Murphy, drifts through life in a drunken haze. She has only two friends—Jess, her understanding roommate, and Tyson, a teenage drug-dealer who saved her from a violent mugging. Out for a walk with her guide dog, Pretzel, she stumbles upon a corpse that must be Tyson's, but it disappears before the police arrive. When they do not seem inclined to investigate, Murphy clings onto the only thing that can keep her together: figuring out what happened to her friend. She resolves to solve the murder herself, while also managing her colorful dating life and the job she hates at Guiding Hope, a school run by her parents for training guide dogs. After falling for Max, who is secretly associated with the drug kingpin who employed Tyson, Murphy is dragged into criminal activity and, soon after, pulls friends and acquaintances with her into the criminal underworld.

== Cast and characters ==
=== Overview ===
Main cast of In the Dark
Actor	Character	Season			
Actor	Character	Season 1	Season 2	Season 3	Season 4
Perry Mattfeld	Murphy Mason	Main	Main	Main	Main
Rich Sommer	Dean Riley	Main	Main		
Brooke Markham	Jess Damon	Main	Main	Main	
Casey Deidrick	Max Parish	Main	Main	Main	Main
Keston John	Darnell James	Main	Main	Main	Main
Morgan Krantz	Felix Bell	Main	Main	Main	Main
Thamela Mpumlwana	Tyson Parker	Main			Guest
Derek Webster	Hank Mason	Main	Guest		
Kathleen York	Joy Mason	Main	Special Guest	Special Guest	Special Guest
Theodore Bhat	Josh Wallace		Recurring	Main	Main
Matt Murray	Gene Clemens		Recurring	Main	Main
Marianne Rendón	Leslie Bell			Recurring	Main

=== Main ===
- Perry Mattfeld as Murphy Mason, a young woman in her 20s who has been totally blind since age 14 from retinitis pigmentosa. Her blindness, introverted personality, and self-destructive lifestyle make her unwelcoming to most people. When a friend is murdered, she finds a new purpose in trying to find his killer and soon becomes involved in criminal activities.
- Rich Sommer as Dean Riley (seasons 1–2), a Chicago PD detective who sympathizes with Murphy, given that his daughter Chloe is also blind.
- Brooke Markham as Jess Damon (seasons 1–3), a veterinarian at Guiding Hope and Murphy's roommate and best friend who also assists her as an informal aide at times.
- Casey Deidrick as Max Parish, a food truck owner and associate of Darnell who becomes attracted to Murphy.
- Keston John as Darnell James, a local gang leader and Tyson's cousin, to whom Murphy turns for help finding him.
- Morgan Krantz as Felix Bell, Murphy's colleague at Guiding Hope who becomes a trusted ally & later on in the series a trusted friend.
- Thamela Mpumlwana as Tyson Parker (season 1; guest season 4), a teenager who saved Murphy from a violent mugging two years previously, and became her closest friend until his untimely death.
- Derek Webster as Hank Mason (season 1; guest season 2), Murphy's adoptive father and the co-owner of Guiding Hope.
- Kathleen York as Joy Mason (season 1; special guest seasons 2–4), Murphy's adoptive mother and the co-owner of Guiding Hope. She is less accepting than Hank of Murphy's poor life choices.
- Theodore Bhat as Josh Wallace (seasons 3–4; recurring season 2), an IRS-CI special agent who is starting to lose his eyesight. He eventually embarks on a hate-filled vendetta against Murphy after she uses and deceives him in trying to cover up her involvement in criminal activities.
- Matt Murray as Officer Gene Clemens (seasons 3–4; recurring season 2), originally Dean's partner on the police force, he is later promoted to head of a narcotics task force for Chicago PD.
- Marianne Rendón as Leslie Bell (season 4; recurring season 3), a lawyer and Felix's sister.

=== Recurring ===
- Levi and Trip as Pretzel, Murphy's loyal guide dog.
- Humberly González as Vanessa (season 1; guest season 2), Jess's ex-girlfriend.
- Calle Walton as Chloe Riley (seasons 1–2 & 4), Dean's daughter who is also blind and looks up to Murphy as a big sister.
- Saycon Sengbloh as Jules Becker (season 1; guest season 2), Dean's partner and Darnell's love interest.
- Leslie Silva as Rhonda Parker (season 1; guest season 4), Tyson's mother.
- Lindsey Broad as Chelsea (seasons 1–2 & 4), Murphy's bartender friend and Dean's love interest, then Felix's.
- Sammy Azero as Wesley Moreno (season 1)
- Nicki Micheaux as Nia Bailey (seasons 1–2), proprietor of a laundromat which serves as a front for her operations as a drug lord and money launderer.
- Ana Ayora as Det. Sarah Barnes (seasons 1 & 3–4), Max's confidential handler who later joins Gene's narcotics task force.
- Chris Perfetti as Ben (season 2), Chelsea's slacker brother hired by Felix as a receptionist at Guiding Hope.
- Natalie Liconti as Sterling Fuller (season 2), Sam's girlfriend who's secretly keeping an eye on Nia's money and drugs hidden at Guiding Hope.
- Cortni Vaughn Joyner as Sam (season 2, guest seasons 1, 3–4), Nia's henchwoman.
- Dewshane Williams as Trey Williams (seasons 2–4) Darnell’s long time friend and Josiah’s henchman.
- Alan Van Sprang as Keith Alper (seasons 2–3)
- Maurice Compte as Josiah (seasons 2–3)
- Kimberly Laferriere as Lauren (season 3)
- Aris Tyros as Beau (season 3)
- Claudia Jurt as Cindy (season 3)
- Stuart Hughes as Det. Miller (season 3, guest season 2)
- Joey Klein as Redford Long (season 3)
- Aiza Ntibarikure as Alex (season 3)
- Roma Maffia as Paula Romano (season 4)
- Dalmar Abuzeid as Navarro (season 4)
- Billy MacLellan as Reggie (season 4)
- Julie Khaner as Kate Simmons (season 4; guest season 3)
- Mimi Kennedy as Gran (season 4)
- Peter Outerbridge as Jimmy McKay (season 4)

== Episodes ==
=== Series overview ===
Season	Episodes	Originally released	
Season	Episodes	First released	Last released
1	13	April 4, 2019	June 27, 2019
2	13	April 16, 2020	July 9, 2020
3	13	June 23, 2021	October 6, 2021
4	13	June 6, 2022	September 5, 2022

=== Season 1 (2019) ===
No. overall	No. in season	Title	Directed by	Written by	Original release date	U.S. viewers (millions)
1	1	"Pilot"	Michael Showalter	Corinne Kingsbury	April 4, 2019	0.87
Murphy, a twenty-something unsocial blind woman, lives a relatively uneventful life full of drunken hookups and chain-smoking, with only Tyson, a teenage drug dealer who befriends her, to confide in. One night, while walking her dog, Murphy stumbles across what she believes to be Tyson's corpse, but when a police investigation turns up nothing, she spirals into depression, culminating in her getting caught cheating with a married man, Bradley, and losing her cane. When she returns to Tyson's old corner, she meets Darnell, Tyson's cousin and supplier, who tells her he's still alive. Bradley's wife, Gayle, rescinds a donation she made to Murphy's parents, driving a wedge between her and her mother Joy, who has given up trying to help her. Out of guilt, Murphy agrees to take a receptionist's job in her family's seeing dog school until she can pay them back. Incensed that no one believes her about Tyson, Murphy takes it upon herself to find him and has his phone's GPS tracked so she can find it. She notifies both Darnell and a friendly cop, Dean, but both discourage her from further investigation. Murphy's roommate Jess tells her that she knows Murphy will try to solve the case anyway.
2	2	"Mommy Issues"	Brian Dannelly	Amy Turner	April 11, 2019	0.72
Murphy, unable to file a missing persons report for Tyson, decides to contact his mother Rhonda since she can do so. She also learns that, due to unpaid bills, her doctor is unwilling to treat her urinary infection. While visiting Dean for an update on the phone, Murphy tells Chloe that her father should consider dating. Jess becomes concerned that Vanessa doesn't love her. Joy and Hank organize a "barkery" event to raise money for the school, which Joy expects her daughter to attend. Murphy goes to Darnell for the address, but he refuses to tell her. Instead, she goes on a one-hour date with Max, one of his associates, for the information. Chloe sets her father up with Jade, a hooker from the station. Jess buys a sex toy to improve her relationship with Vanessa. Max takes Murphy to a beach, and then gives her the address. Murphy goes there, visits Tyson's room, and then tells Rhonda the truth. Dean contacts Murphy, and delivers the news that while Tyson's phone was completely wiped, they can now push forward with his case. Max shows up and gets her to agree to have a drink with him. Jess finds a new clue for Murphy. Darnell tells his incarcerated boss, Nia, that he'll deal with Murphy.
3	3	"The Big Break"	Norman Buckley	Lindsay Golder	April 18, 2019	0.64
While having sex, Murphy shoves Max off when he admits his feelings for her and injures his genitals. She and Jess go to speak with Tyson's girlfriend, but get kicked off school property. Murphy subsequently convinces Felix to hold an outreach event at the school so she can get access. Max tries to break through Murphy's emotional walls, so she kicks him out. Darnell steals some of the money he's collecting for Tyson's mother, but she refuses to take it. Felix is nervous about addressing the students, but finds that he can connect with them when he pretends to be blind. Murphy finds Keira's friends and learn that she's been missing school. She then has sex with a teacher, which accidentally exposes Felix's deception and humiliates him publicly. Murphy makes up for the embarrassment by offering Felix a cigarette and encouraging him to start standing up for himself. Dean tries to help Chloe deal with her first period; Murphy comes to help by roasting Chloe at her request. Keira visits Murphy and reveals that Tyson cheated on her with a girl named Jamie, and provides her address. Murphy meets Max at the bar and decides that she does, in fact, want to date him.
4	4	"The Graduate"	Patricia Cardoso	Yael Zinkow	April 25, 2019	0.75
Murphy and Chloe illegally use Dean's police computer to find Jaime's address, which happens to be six hours away in Wisconsin. With Jess unable to drive her, she asks Max instead and lies to Joy to get out of a prior commitment. However, when Murphy gets stuck in a bathroom stall and then nearly gets hit by a truck, she rudely refuses his help. One of the school's trainers refuses to relinquish custody of her guide dog. Felix accidentally exposes Murphy's lie to Joy. Dean's partner, Jules, learns that Tyson witnessed a murder shortly before his disappearance. Jaime turns out to not be a girl, but the name of Tyson's biological father, who tells her that Tyson is alive and living away from Chicago. Joy learns that Jess has a secret tracking app installed on Murphy's phone; the two bond over their mutual worry for her safety. Murphy gets drunk and behaves inappropriately at a restaurant, causing Max to get arrested; she then gets him released by using her disability to accuse the manager of assaulting her. When they return home, Murphy introduces him to Joy and convinces the trainer to release her dog. Darnell is revealed to be in a secret relationship with Jules.
5	5	"The Feels"	Ingrid Jungermann	Deagan Fryklind	May 2, 2019	0.50
Dean shares his new lead with Murphy, and hits it off with Chelsea, a bartender. Murphy becomes increasingly worried that she might be pregnant. Darnell tries to go out on a date with Jules, but an unexpected call ruins it. Murphy, unsure of herself, decides to feel a dead body to determine if she really felt Tyson's corpse. She and Jess go to see Felix's dying uncle, and his mother invites them to stay over. Darnell tells Max that he needs to end things with Murphy. Felix confesses to the girls that he is mostly estranged from his unsupportive family and values their friendship, but when a drunk Murphy reveals why they came, he throws them out. Jess and Murphy argue, and Murphy calls Max for support while Jess apologizes to Felix. Jules warns Darnell of an impending police raid, and he escapes with Max, who then tells him he's not going to leave Murphy. Murphy visits a shop that Tyson helped run drugs out of, but while having her period in the bathroom, she overhears the owner being murdered and feels his body. Jules admits that she still loves Darnell, and Tyson's body is found in a bag in the river.
6	6	"Tyson"	Ryan McFaul	David Babcock	May 9, 2019	0.51
Dean informs Murphy of Tyson's death; shattered, she gets arrested when she tries to smoke at the crime scene and refuses to answer any questions. She also dumps Max when he insists on talking about her feelings. Rhonda bitterly refuses to let Darnell pay for Tyson's funeral. Dean and Jules call Murphy back in and reveal that Tyson was killed by a gunshot to the head; Murphy then realizes that he was alive when she found him, making her feel responsible for his death. When she tries to smother her guilt by hooking up with a bar patron, he turns her down when he realizes she's too drunk to feel anything. Dean encourages her to go to the funeral, but she gets kicked out after arguing with Jaime. Darnell, however, leaves the door open so she can listen from outside. Rhonda finds video recordings of Murphy on Tyson's computer and reaches out to her, giving her a small jar of his ashes which she then spreads across a lake. Having finally achieved closure, she goes to find Max hoping for forgiveness. Instead, she overhears a conversation between him and one of Nia's associates, Wesley Moreno, whose voice she recognizes as that of the man who murdered the shop owner.
7	7	"The One That Got Away"	Anna Mastro	Ryan Knighton	May 16, 2019	0.52
Nia denies Darnell permission to deal with Wesley, saying she wants to handle it. Murphy reports Wesley to the police and picks him out of a voice line-up. Hank asks Felix to discreetly procure him some weed. Murphy takes Chloe to the mall. Out on bail, Wesley abducts them, but Murphy uses a message written in lipstick to get a bystander to call 911. Darnell, Max, and Jess track down Wesley, who gets run over by a truck while trying to escape. A furious Dean forbids Murphy from seeing Chloe or him ever again. Felix cuts a check to buy Guiding Hope after learning that the school is completely broke. Jules learns from the medical examiner that although Wesley shot Tyson, someone else must have been involved.
8	8	"Jessica Rabbit"	Kyra Sedgwick	Eric Randall	May 23, 2019	0.60
Max insists that Murphy spend the night at his apartment, and Dean tries to reconnect with her after his fury settles. The man who struck Wesley identifies Jess as having witnessed his death to the police; Darnell and Max agree to help her by cleaning her car of Wesley's DNA, but worry that Jess' trauma and poor ability to lie will expose them. Felix assumes ownership of the school despite Joy refusing to sign on to the deal. Jess, feeling that Vanessa does not understand or appreciate her feelings, turns away from her. Darnell advises Jess to use emotional manipulation to throw off the cops, which allows her to pass questioning unscathed. When Vanessa fails to show up for a makeup date, however, she winds up cheating on her with a girl at the bar and decides to hide it. Joy, impressed with Felix's devotion to Guiding Hope, agrees to sign. When Murphy returns home, Jess passes information from Chelsea to her about Tyson's other killer. Felix informs Murphy that from now on, she'll be expected to work like everyone else. He also shows off a new watch—the same watch Wesley owned and that Murphy tried to dispose of. Murphy takes it to Dean, blowing off a dinner Max had planned for her.
9	9	"Deal or No Deal"	Steve Tsuchida	Kara Brown	May 30, 2019	0.58
Jess tries to recommit herself to Vanessa, while Murphy feels disloyal to Max for spending the night at Dean's (which also upsets Chelsea). Video footage of Darnell and Wesley getting in a confrontation with Tyson surfaces, leading Murphy to suspect that Tyson was killed for informing on the gang. Darnell refuses to cooperate with the police, and Jules leaves him. He decides to ask Nia for more responsibility, and asks Max to front the cash for a deal, unaware that he is, in fact, an informant. Max tips off his handler, Det. Barnes, to the deal, and is told to find out where it's taking place. Jess, overwhelmed with guilt, admits to cheating on Vanessa on the night of their seven-month anniversary. Felix then drives her and Murphy to Max's place, where they find a text leading them to a hotel room where the deal is set to take place. Jess ponders whether she tanked her relationship with Vanessa on purpose. Max runs into Murphy; when she learns the truth, she runs off blaming him for Tyson's death. Max loses heart and flees without delivering the money, while Jules arrests Darnell for Tyson's murder to protect him from Barnes.
10	10	"Bait and Switch"	Randy Zisk	Louisa Levy	June 6, 2019	0.60
Darnell realizes Max set him up and gets word to Nia. Nia doesn't waste any time sending out one of her goons to hunt down Max and take care of him. Murphy gets wrapped up in Max's flight plan by being in the wrong place at the wrong time and the couple, amidst their troubles, is forced to hole up in a cabin to escape Nia's wrath. Max and Murphy hook-up, shortly afterwards Nia's goon shows up and the couple flee. Max decides it will be safer for Murphy if they separate and puts her on a boat and tells her to row, she does and off in the distance hears two gun shots. Jules gets her badge suspended for interfering in the sting, however, everyone is still oblivious to her being involved with Darnell.
11	11	"I Woke Up Like This"	David Grossman	Kara Brown	June 13, 2019	0.64
Murphy finally gets help after roaming around the woods from the night before. Determined to find out the fate of Max. Murphy visits Max's ex-girlfriend Jenny, to see if she has any info on Max's whereabouts. After realizing that Max isn't going to show up to Jenny's house, Murphy and Jess go Max's favorite bar, and he finally shows up. However, the reunion is short lived because Felix reported the Guiding Hope van stolen and Murphy and Jess arrested. While in jail Murphy and Jess get in a fight over Murphy's obsession over Tyson's death. Jess decides to stop enabling Murphy and moves into Felix's place. Felix is cut off from his trust fund for buying Guiding Hope. Jules finds surveillance video that proves Darnell's DNA was planted in Tyson's car. She comes clean to Dean about her relationship with Darnell, and Dean decides to try and help her find out who framed Darnell. Nia is released from prison due to lack of evidence.
12	12	"Rollin' with the Homies"	Janice Cooke	Flint Wainess & Yael Zinkow	June 20, 2019	0.60
It's Murphy's birthday and she reflects on some of her past birthdays with her friends and family who celebrated it with her. Nia visits Murphy and denies having anything to do with Tyson's death and warns her off. Feeling alone Murphy asks Dean to take her to the roller skating rink for her birthday, Jess, Felix, and others come along to celebrate too. Dean finally admits his feelings for Murphy and they share a kiss. Determined to prove Darnell innocent, Jules continues to investigate the Tyson case, following Nia and witnessing her meet secretly with another police officer.
13	13	"It's Always Been You"	Corinne Kingsbury	Corinne Kingsbury	June 27, 2019	0.63
Felix needs money for Guiding Hope, so he and Jess go to the cabin by the lake and find the drug money that Max hid. Jules calls Murphy and provides her with clues about Tyson's murderer. Jules is then attacked by one of Nia's thugs. Murphy sleeps with Dean and gets him to confess that he killed Tyson. Dean confesses that he was providing tips to Nia in exchange for money to pay for Chloe's medical bills, and killed Tyson after he threatened to reveal Dean's secret. Murphy tries to escape with a recording but Dean catches her and forces her into his car. Murphy attacks Dean, causing the car to crash. Nia visits Murphy in the hospital and informs her that since her friends have the money, they can start laundering it through Guiding Hope for her.

=== Season 2 (2020) ===
No. overall	No. in season	Title	Directed by	Written by	Original release date	U.S. viewers (millions)
14	1	"All About the Benjamin"	John Francis Daley & Jonathan Goldstein	Corinne Kingsbury	April 16, 2020	0.41
15	2	"Cross My Heart and Hope To Lie"	Brian Dannelly	Yael Zinkow	April 23, 2020	0.39
16	3	"Son of a Gun"	Ryan McFaul	Flint Wainess	April 30, 2020	0.39
17	4	"Deal Me In"	Jeff Chan	Ryan Knighton	May 7, 2020	0.36
18	5	"The Unusual Suspects"	Ingrid Jungermann	Adrian A. Cruz	May 14, 2020	0.36
19	6	"The Truth Hurts"	David Grossman	Malarie Howard	May 21, 2020	0.54
20	7	"The Straw That Broke the Camel's Back"	Gandja Monteiro	Jess Burkle	May 28, 2020	0.46
21	8	"Codependence Day"	Steven Tsuchida	Amy Turner	June 4, 2020	0.43
22	9	"How to Succeed in Business Without Really Dying"	Clara Aranovich	Anna Fisher	June 11, 2020	0.43
23	10	"The Last Dance"	Steve Tsuchida	Chelsea Taylor	June 18, 2020	0.45
24	11	"Bad People"	David Grossman	Daniel Rogers	June 25, 2020	0.45
25	12	"Where Have You Ben?"	Brian Dannelly	Karine Rosenthal	July 2, 2020	0.46
26	13	"My Pride and Joy"	Corinne Kingsbury	Yael Zinkow	July 9, 2020	0.40

=== Season 3 (2021) ===
No. overall	No. in season	Title	Directed by	Written by	Original release date	U.S. viewers (millions)
27	1	"Hanging by a Thread"	Ryan McFaul	Corinne Kingsbury & Yael Zinkow	June 23, 2021	0.42
28	2	"I Know What You Did Last Night"	Emmanuel Osei-Kuffour, Jr.	Corinne Kingsbury & Yael Zinkow	June 30, 2021	0.40
29	3	"Somewhere Over the Border"	Ryan McFaul	Teleplay by : Corinne Kingsbury & Yael Zinkow; Story by : Ryan Knighton	July 7, 2021	0.42
30	4	"Safe and Sound"	Emmanuel Osei-Kuffour, Jr.	Yael Zinkow & Malarie Howard	July 14, 2021	0.39
31	5	"Planes, Trains and Automobiles"	Annie Bradley	Corinne Kingsbury & Anna Fisher	July 21, 2021	0.39
32	6	"Arcade Fire"	Ingrid Jungermann	Yael Zinkow & Jason Pierre	August 11, 2021	0.31
33	7	"Pretty in Pink"	Ingrid Jungermann	Jess Burkle	August 18, 2021	0.41
34	8	"Power Trip"	Jeff Chan	Corinne Kingsbury & Yael Zinkow	August 25, 2021	0.36
35	9	"Excess Baggage"	Clara Aranovich	Corinne Kingsbury & Yael Zinkow	September 1, 2021	0.37
36	10	"Home Run"	Jeff Chan	Corinne Kingsbury & Yael Zinkow	September 8, 2021	0.37
37	11	"Match Point"	Clara Aranovich	Yael Zinkow & Annie Hayes	September 22, 2021	0.28
38	12	"Do You Hear What I Hear?"	Steven Tsuchida	Yael Zinkow	September 29, 2021	0.28
39	13	"Expectation is the Root of All Heartache"	Steven Tsuchida	Corinne Kingsbury	October 6, 2021	0.35

=== Season 4 (2022) ===
No. overall	No. in season	Title	Directed by	Written by	Original release date	U.S. viewers (millions)
40	1	"Bail's in Your Court"	Annie Bradley	Yael Zinkow	June 6, 2022	0.29
41	2	"No Cane Do"	Annie Bradley	Annie Hayes	June 13, 2022	0.28
42	3	"If Books Could Kill"	Dinh Thai	Jeannine Renshaw & Nic Strain	June 20, 2022	0.29
43	4	"Hard Pill to Swallow"	Samir Rehem	Corinne Kingsbury	June 27, 2022	0.31
44	5	"The Trial of Murphy Mason, Part One"	Dinh Thai	Jess Burkle	July 11, 2022	0.29
45	6	"The Trial of Murphy Mason, Part Two"	Dinh Thai	Jess Burkle	July 18, 2022	0.25
46	7	"C.I. Was Right"	Morgan Krantz	Amy Turner & Anna Fisher	July 25, 2022	0.25
47	8	"Tequila Mockingbird"	Natalie Leite	Jason Pierre	August 1, 2022	0.32
48	9	"Center of Gravity"	Chloe Sarbib	Corinne Kingsbury	August 8, 2022	0.32
49	10	"No Time to Spare"	Joey Klein	Yael Zinkow	August 15, 2022	0.32
50	11	"The Deep End"	Samir Rehem	Jeannine Renshaw	August 22, 2022	0.25
51	12	"Going Up"	Malakai	Yael Zinkow & Jeannine Renshaw	August 29, 2022	0.35
52	13	"Please Shine Down on Me"	Ryan McFaul	Corinne Kingsbury	September 5, 2022	0.25
Everyone, including Josh, attend Max's funeral. During the eulogy, Murphy declares revenge on Max's killer. After the funeral, Chloe and Murphy make amends. Murphy visits Jimmy in prison and he reveals Josh is the one who tipped him off the night of the fundraiser. That night, Murphy breaks into Josh's apartment to kill him but he isn't there. Felix wakes up to find Murphy missing so he goes to Josh's and finds Murphy waiting. Felix and Murphy find a printout for a rental house in Missouri so they drive there to find him. When they arrive, Josh confronts them with a gun. Felix tackles Josh, they tussle and Felix is able to get the gun. Felix ties up Josh. Felix convinces Josh to tell Murphy he is sorry but she doesn't believe him. Felix leaves but takes the gun. Murphy tries to kill Josh but he is able to untie himself. Before he is able to get away, Murphy kills him. Murphy and Pretzel walk to a nearby convenience store where she cleans up and buys new clothes. Murphy dumps all the bloody clothes into a nearby dumpster. Felix picks up Murphy and they drive off together.

== Production ==
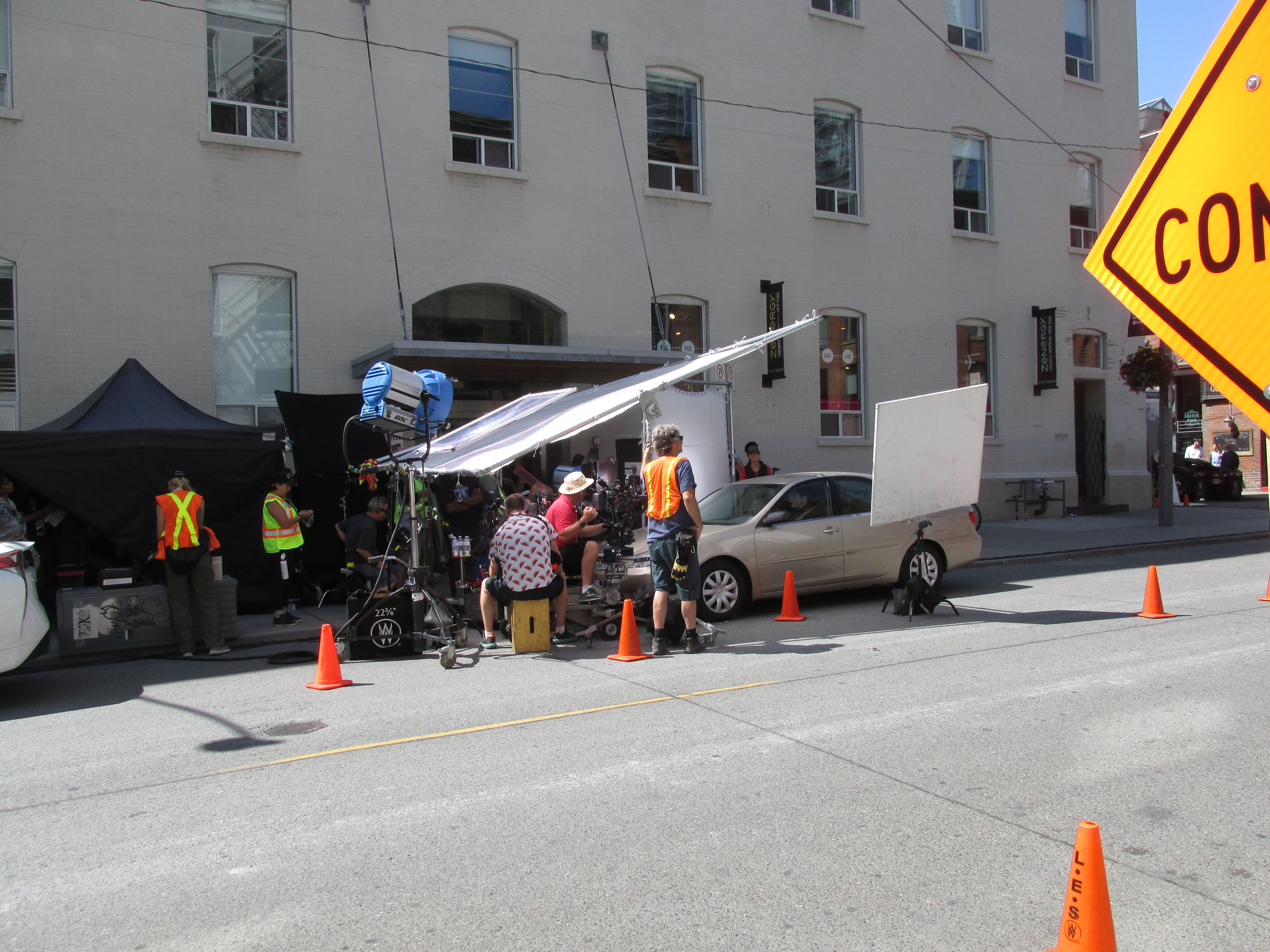
Filming for In the Dark in Toronto, Ontario, Canada.

=== Development ===
The series was created by Corinne Kingsbury for The CW, to debut during the 2018–19 television season. On January 30, 2018, The CW officially ordered the pilot. The series was greenlit on May 11, 2018.

In the Dark is the first CW primetime series to carry Descriptive Video Service audio, though The CW, as a minor network, is not required to have any DVS provisions under the regulations for audio description for their affiliates, so the base of stations carrying that track is smaller than other networks where carriage of descriptive video is required. The series premiered on April 4, 2019. On April 24, 2019, The CW renewed the series for a second season, that was originally scheduled to premiere on May 28, 2020, however it was moved to premiere date on April 16, 2020. On January 7, 2020, the series was renewed for a third season which premiered on June 23, 2021. On February 3, 2021, The CW renewed the series for a fourth season which premiered on June 6, 2022. On May 12, 2022, The CW announced that the fourth season will be its last.

=== Casting ===
On March 2, 2018, it was announced that Perry Mattfeld had been cast in the protagonist role of Murphy in the series' pilot, along with Brooke Markham as Jess, Murphy's roommate and best friend, and Keston John as Darnell, a local drug dealer; followed on March 9 with Kathleen York as Joy, Murphy's mother, and Derek Webster as Hank, Joy's husband. Austin Nichols was cast as Dean, a cop with a blind daughter, on March 12. On May 16, 2018, The CW announced that the role of Dean had been recast; with Nichols thereafter replaced by Rich Sommer on July 13, 2018. On September 10, 2019, Matt Murray was cast in a recurring role for the second season.

The show received some criticism for casting a sighted actor to play a blind character. British actor James Moore, who plays a disabled character in the soap opera Emmerdale and has a disability himself, argued that disabled actors will always be better placed to play disabled roles due to their life experience. On review aggregator Rotten Tomatoes, critics worried that the "questionable treatment of physical handicaps may leave some viewers with a dim impression." During a panel discussion at the Television Critics Association press tour, executive producer Nicky Weinstock defended the choices, claiming that they initially auditioned blind actors, but ultimately cast Perry because she was the best actor for the role.

=== Filming ===
Filming on the pilot began on March 12, 2018, in Toronto, Ontario, Canada; and wrapped on March 28. Principal photography on season 1 began on August 8, 2018, and ended on December 21, 2018. Principal photography for the second season began on August 19, 2019, and ended on January 24, 2020, in Toronto and Cambridge, Ontario, Canada. Filming for the series' third season began on November 2, 2020, and concluded on April 21, 2021. Filming for the fourth and final season began on November 29, 2021, and concluded on May 31, 2022.

== Broadcast ==
In the Dark premiered on The CW on April 4, 2019 and ended on September 5, 2022.

In Canada, the series premiered on April 4, 2019, on Bravo!. The series continues to be broadcast on the channel, which is now branded as CTV Drama Channel. In fall 2020, the second season was re-run on CTV 2 starting September 15.

== Reception ==
=== Critical response ===
On review aggregator Rotten Tomatoes, the series holds an approval rating of 73% based on 15 reviews, with an average rating of 7.16/10. The website's critical consensus reads, "Perry Mattfield is compelling as an amateur sleuth In the Dark, although the series' recycling of mystery tropes and questionable treatment of physical handicaps may leave some viewers with a dim impression." On Metacritic, it has a weighted average score of 54 out of 100, based on 6 critics, indicating "mixed or average reviews".

=== Ratings ===
==== Overall ====
Viewership and ratings per season of In the Dark
Season	Timeslot (ET)	Episodes	First aired		Last aired		TV season
Season	Timeslot (ET)	Episodes	Date	Viewers (millions)	Date	Viewers (millions)	TV season
1	Thursday 9:00 p.m.	13	April 4, 2019	0.87	June 27, 2019	0.63	2018–19
2	Thursday 9:00 p.m.	13	April 16, 2020	0.41	July 9, 2020	0.40	2019–20
3	Wednesday 9:00 p.m.	13	June 23, 2021	0.42	October 6, 2021	0.35	2020–21
4	Monday 9:00 p.m.	13	June 6, 2022	0.29	September 5, 2022	0.25	2021–22

==== Season 1 ====
Viewership and ratings per episode of In the Dark
No.	Title	Air date	Rating/share (18–49)	Viewers (millions)	DVR (18–49)	DVR viewers (millions)	Total (18–49)	Total viewers (millions)
1	"Pilot"	April 4, 2019	0.2/1	0.87	0.1	0.35	0.3	1.22
2	"Mommy Issues"	April 11, 2019	0.2/1	0.72	0.0	0.33	0.2	1.05
3	"The Big Break"	April 18, 2019	0.2/1	0.64	0.0	0.35	0.2	0.99
4	"The Graduate"	April 25, 2019	0.2/1	0.75	0.1	0.30	0.3	1.05
5	"The Feels"	May 2, 2019	0.1/1	0.50	—N/a	0.27	—N/a	0.77
6	"Tyson"	May 9, 2019	0.1/1	0.51	0.1	0.25	0.2	0.80
7	"The One That Got Away"	May 16, 2019	0.2/1	0.52	0.0	0.33	0.2	0.85
8	"Jessica Rabbit"	May 23, 2019	0.2/1	0.60	0.0	0.30	0.2	0.90
9	"Deal or No Deal"	May 30, 2019	0.1/1	0.58	0.1	0.27	0.2	0.85
10	"Bait and Switch"	June 6, 2019	0.1/1	0.60	0.1	0.32	0.2	0.92
11	"I Woke Up Like This"	June 13, 2019	0.1/1	0.64	0.1	0.23	0.2	0.87
12	"Rollin' with the Homies"	June 20, 2019	0.2/1	0.60	0.0	0.29	0.2	0.89
13	"It's Always Been You"	June 27, 2019	0.2/1	0.63	0.0	0.30	0.2	0.93

==== Season 2 ====
Viewership and ratings per episode of In the Dark
No.	Title	Air date	Rating (18–49)	Viewers (millions)	DVR (18–49)	DVR viewers (millions)	Total (18–49)	Total viewers (millions)
1	"All About the Benjamin"	April 16, 2020	0.1	0.41	TBD	TBD	TBD	TBD
2	"Cross My Heart and Hope To Lie"	April 23, 2020	0.1	0.39	TBD	TBD	TBD	TBD
3	"Son of a Gun"	April 30, 2020	0.1	0.39	TBD	TBD	TBD	TBD
4	"Deal Me In"	May 7, 2020	0.1	0.36	TBD	TBD	TBD	TBD
5	"The Unusual Suspects"	May 14, 2020	0.1	0.36	TBD	TBD	TBD	TBD
6	"The Truth Hurts"	May 21, 2020	0.1	0.54	TBD	TBD	TBD	TBD
7	"The Straw That Broke the Camel's Back"	May 28, 2020	0.1	0.46	TBD	TBD	TBD	TBD
8	"Codependence Day"	June 4, 2020	0.1	0.43	TBD	TBD	TBD	TBD
9	"How to Succeed in Business Without Really Dying"	June 11, 2020	0.1	0.43	TBD	TBD	TBD	TBD
10	"The Last Dance"	June 18, 2020	0.1	0.45	TBD	TBD	TBD	TBD
11	"Bad People"	June 25, 2020	0.1	0.45	TBD	TBD	TBD	TBD
12	"Where Have You Ben?"	July 2, 2020	0.1	0.46	TBD	TBD	TBD	TBD
13	"My Pride and Joy"	July 9, 2020	0.1	0.40	TBD	TBD	TBD	TBD

==== Season 3 ====
Viewership and ratings per episode of In the Dark
No.	Title	Air date	Rating (18–49)	Viewers (millions)	DVR (18–49)	DVR viewers (millions)	Total (18–49)	Total viewers (millions)
1	"Hanging by a Thread"	June 23, 2021	0.1	0.42	0.1	0.25	0.1	0.67
2	"I Know What You Did Last Night"	June 30, 2021	0.1	0.40	0.1	0.23	0.1	0.63
3	"Somewhere Over the Border"	July 7, 2021	0.1	0.42	0.1	0.33	0.2	0.75
4	"Safe and Sound"	July 14, 2021	0.1	0.39	0.1	0.25	0.2	0.63
5	"Planes, Trains and Automobiles"	July 21, 2021	0.1	0.39	0.1	0.25	0.1	0.64
6	"Arcade Fire"	August 11, 2021	0.1	0.31	0.1	0.22	0.1	0.53
7	"Pretty in Pink"	August 18, 2021	0.1	0.41	0.1	0.25	0.1	0.66
8	"Power Trip"	August 25, 2021	0.1	0.36	TBD	TBD	TBD	TBD
9	"Excess Baggage"	September 1, 2021	0.1	0.37	TBD	TBD	TBD	TBD
10	"Home Run"	September 8, 2021	0.1	0.37	TBD	TBD	TBD	TBD
11	"Match Point"	September 22, 2021	0.0	0.28	TBD	TBD	TBD	TBD
12	"Do You Hear What I Hear?"	September 29, 2021	0.0	0.28	TBD	TBD	TBD	TBD
13	"Expectation is the Root of All Heartache"	October 6, 2021	0.1	0.35	TBD	TBD	TBD	TBD

==== Season 4 ====
Viewership and ratings per episode of In the Dark
No.	Title	Air date	Rating (18–49)	Viewers (millions)
1	"Bail's in Your Court"	June 6, 2022	0.0	0.29
2	"No Cane Do"	June 13, 2022	0.0	0.28
3	"If Books Could Kill"	June 20, 2022	0.0	0.29
4	"Hard Pill to Swallow"	June 27, 2022	0.0	0.31
5	"The Trial of Murphy Mason, Part One"	July 11, 2022	0.0	0.29
6	"The Trial of Murphy Mason, Part Two"	July 18, 2022	0.1	0.25
7	"C.I. Was Right"	July 25, 2022	0.0	0.25
8	"Tequila Mockingbird"	August 1, 2022	0.0	0.32
9	"Center of Gravity"	August 8, 2022	0.0	0.32
10	"No Time to Spare"	August 15, 2022	0.1	0.32
11	"The Deep End"	August 22, 2022	0.0	0.25
12	"Going Up"	August 29, 2022	0.1	0.35
13	"Please Shine Down on Me"	September 5, 2022	0.1	0.25
