= Derek Webster (actor) =

American actor (born 1968)

- Born: Bakersfield, California, US
- Occupation: Actor
- Years active: 1980s–present

Derek Webster is an American actor best known for the role of Raleigh Jordan in the 1997-1999 superhero TV series Night Man. He is also known for his roles in In the Dark, 9-1-1: Lone Star, NCIS: New Orleans, CSI: Vegas and Mayor of Kingstown.

== Career ==
Born in Bakersfield, California, he started acting in the late 1980s, and has appeared in over 100 films and television shows.

Among TV shows he guest-starred in were Grey's Anatomy, Castle, Good Doctor. He recurred on Ray Donovan, Star Trek: Picard as Romulan Guard, Harry's Law, Damages, NCIS: New Orleans as Raymond Isler and on CSI: Vegas as new coroner, Dr. Milton Hudson.

He also recurred on 9-1-1: Lone Star as Charles, husband of Gina Torres' character, Captain Tommy Vega. He left the show during the second season when his character died of aneurysm. He was cast in Lee Daniels' TV series Our Kind of People.

Webster was a main cast member on the first season of In the Dark. He is also a main cast member on Mayor of Kingstown starring Jeremy Renner and Dianne Wiest. He plays Kingstown police officer Stevie, a loyal ally to the McLusky family.

=== Film ===
He appeared in three films directed by Roland Emmerich: Stargate, Independence Day and Godzilla. In Stargate he played Senior Airman Brown, a member of Colonel Jack O'Neil's team who was killed by a Horus guard. In Independence Day starring Will Smith, Webster played the role of a pilot who is killed when the helicopter sent to make the first contact with one of the alien ships is destroyed.
