= Marianne Rendón =

American actress

- Education: Bard College (BA); Juilliard School (MFA)
- Occupations: Actress; musician
- Years active: 2017–present
- Spouse: Ker Wells (died 2019)

Marianne Rendón is an American actress known for her role as Susan Atkins in the biopic film Charlie Says about the life of Charles Manson, as Julia "Jules" Langmore on the Bravo dark comedy television series Imposters, and as Leslie Bell on the CW crime drama In the Dark.

== Early life and education ==
Rendón was born to Robert Rendón, a sound technician and Valerie Lemon-Rendón, a singer. She was raised in New Rochelle, New York. Marianne was educated at Bard College in upstate New York. While at Bard, she and friend Lola Kirke formed band "Sheroes", an all-female country feminist band. She graduated from the Juilliard School in 2016. She was married to actor and teacher Ker Wells until his death from pancreatic cancer on August 30, 2019.

== Career ==
Rendón played Julia "Jules" Langmore, a main role in the 2017 television series Imposters.

In July 2017, she was brought in to replace Zosia Mamet in the role of Patti Smith in the film Mapplethorpe, a biopic based on the photographer Robert Mapplethorpe.

In March 2018, she was cast to play the role of Susan Atkins in the biopic Charlie Says about the life of Charles Manson.

In 2021, Rendón was introduced in season 3 of the CW series In the Dark as Leslie Bell, a lawyer and sister of main character Felix Bell. She appeared in a recurring role that season, and was promoted to the main cast for season 4.

== Filmography ==
=== Film ===
Year	Title	Role	Notes
2017	Gemini	Cassandra	
2018	Mapplethorpe	Patti Smith	
2018	Charlie Says	Susan Atkins	
2023	One Day as a Lion	Lola	
2023	The Kill Room	Nicole	Post-production
2024	Bellyache	Dede	Post-production
2025	The Life List	Zoe	

=== Television ===
Year	Title	Role	Notes
2017–2018	Imposters	Julia "Jules" Langmore	Main role
2020	Almost Family	Skylar	Episode: "Courageous AF"
2021-2022	In The Dark	Leslie Bell	Main role
2023-	Extrapolations	Gabriela	Episode: "#1.3"
