= 9JKL =

American television sitcom (2017–2018)

- Genre: Sitcom
- Created by: Dana Klein; Mark Feuerstein
- Starring: Mark Feuerstein; Linda Lavin; David Walton; Liza Lapira; Albert Tsai; Elliott Gould; Matt Murray
- Opening theme: "Won't You Take Me Home Rock" by Gabriel Mann
- Composer: Gabriel Mann
- Country of origin: United States
- Original language: English
- No. of seasons: 1
- No. of episodes: 16

Production
- Executive producers: Dana Klein; Mark Feuerstein; Aaron Kaplan; Wendi Trilling; Dana Honor
- Camera setup: Multi-camera
- Running time: 22 minutes
- Production companies: Liscolaide Productions; Trill TV; Kapital Entertainment; CBS Television Studios

Original release
- Network: CBS
- Release: October 2, 2017 – February 5, 2018

9JKL is an American sitcom television series that was created and executive produced by Dana Klein and Mark Feuerstein, loosely based on the life of the couple, who are married in real life. The series aired from October 2, 2017, to February 5, 2018 on CBS. It stars Feuerstein, Linda Lavin, David Walton, Elliott Gould, and Liza Lapira. On May 12, 2018, CBS cancelled the series after one season.

== Premise ==
Josh Roberts, a divorced actor whose fictional TV series Blind Cop was recently cancelled, moves back to New York City and lives in apartment 9K. His family lives in adjacent apartments: his parents live in 9J, while his brother, sister-in-law, and their newborn baby live in 9L. This unique situation prompts Josh to try and set boundaries while reconnecting with his family members.

The show is loosely based on Feuerstein's experiences while shooting the USA Network series Royal Pains; in real life, Feuerstein lived with his wife, 9JKL executive producer Dana Klein, housed next to his own family.

== Cast ==
=== Main ===
- Mark Feuerstein as Josh Roberts, a divorced TV actor
- Elliott Gould as Harry Roberts, the patriarch of the Roberts family and Josh and Andrew's father
- Linda Lavin as Judy Roberts, the matriarch of the family and Josh and Andrew's mother
- Liza Lapira as Eve Roberts, Andrew's wife and Josh's sister-in-law
- David Walton as Andrew Roberts, Josh's younger brother
- Albert Tsai as Ian
- Matt Murray as Nick

=== Recurring ===
- Tone Bell as Luke

=== Guest stars ===
- Robert Costanzo as Massimo
- Brooke D'Orsay as Natalie
- Paul Feig as himself
- Phil Morris as Dr. Starnes
- Christina Pickles as Lenore
- Michael Showalter as Walter Michaelson
- Lois Smith as Wrong Nana
- Fred Willard as Dick
- Cheri Oteri as Patty Partridge
- Andrea Anders as Lauren

== Episodes ==
No.	Title	Directed by	Written by	Original release date	Prod. code	US viewers (millions)
1	"Pilot"	Pamela Fryman	Dana Klein & Mark Feuerstein	October 2, 2017	JKL101	8.21
Divorced actor Josh Roberts returns home to New York after his series Blind Cop is cancelled. Josh tries to reconnect with college crush Christina (Sally Pressman), but having his parents in one next-door apartment and his brother and sister-in-law in the other puts a damper on any romance.
2	"Relationship Guy"	Pamela Fryman	Austin Winsberg	October 9, 2017	JKL104	7.04
Josh tries to prove to Andrew and Eve that he is capable of having a one-night stand. He seems to be successful after a night with Lily (Mouzam Makkar), only to have Lily meet Judy in the lobby and spend an entire day with her. Meanwhile, Andrew learns that Eve initially intended for him to be a one-night stand.
3	"Cool Friend Luke"	Victor Gonzalez	Jim Reynolds	October 16, 2017	JKL105	6.66
Josh meets a fellow bicycle enthusiast named Luke (Tone Bell) and is happy to finally have a friend outside of family. But he soon learns that Judy holds a grudge against Luke, who lives in the apartment above hers, for damaging the ceiling above their shower.
4	"High Steaks"	Pamela Fryman	Tom Hertz	October 23, 2017	JKL103	7.17
Josh ditches Survivor night with Judy to join Andrew and Harry for their monthly racquetball night, in which they really just eat steaks and drink scotch. This forces Judy and Eve to spend time with just each other, which becomes uncomfortable for both of them.
5	"The Key to Life"	Pamela Fryman	Dana Klein & Mark Feuerstein	October 30, 2017	JKL102	5.05
Judy's feelings are hurt when Josh changes the locks on his front and balcony doors, and refuses to give her a key because she's always barging in without knocking. Meanwhile, Eve notices that Judy has cropped Josh's ex-wife out of every old family photo, and realizes that's why Judy places her on the end in every current photo. Also, Andrew secretly enlists Nick's help to assemble a foreign-made crib that Eve brought home.
6	"TV MD"	Jeff Greenstein	Austen Earl	November 6, 2017	JKL107	4.36
Harry and Judy shower Andrew with attention after he lands a local TV job as a medical correspondent, with help from Josh. This causes Eve to become frustrated over her in-laws' lack of boundaries, as they are always at her apartment. Josh is initially ecstatic to have more alone time in his apartment, but starts to become jealous when his brother is treated like a star.
7	"Nanny Wars"	Victor Gonzalez	Talia Bernstein	November 13, 2017	JKL109	4.33
Eve and Andrew find a perfect nanny for Wyatt named Sara (Megan Park), but are worried about losing her when she and Josh become attracted to each other. Josh soon learns that Sara is much better with babies than with adults. Also, after Andrew gets Harry and Judy a new TV with streaming services, they both remember why they prefer to watch in separate rooms.
8	"Make Thanksgiving Great Again"	Pamela Fryman	Stephanie Darrow	November 20, 2017	JKL108	4.42
Josh asks Nick to retrieve Nana Roberts (Harry's mother) from her nursing home for the family's Thanksgiving gathering, but when Nick arrives with the wrong nana (Lois Smith), the family is forced to deal with a stranger who antagonizes everyone. This makes Judy realize her own critical tendencies, especially toward Eve. Meanwhile, Andrew prepares for a sexy calendar photoshoot.
9	"Lovers Getaway"	Jeff Greenstein	Gracie Glassmeyer	November 27, 2017	JKL106	4.60
When Harry catches the flu and can't go on a pre-planned spa weekend with Judy, Josh takes his dad's place and accompanies mom on the trip. While at the resort, Josh meets Natalie (Brooke D'Orsay) who is there for a friend's bachelorette party, and soon struggles to go on a date with Natalie while fulfilling Judy's event requests. At home, things become miserable for Andrew and Eve when they catch Harry's illness.
10	"The Family Plot"	Victor Gonzalez	Tom Hertz	December 4, 2017	JKL110	4.62
When Harry and Judy get a deal on four burial plots, Andrew insists that the other two go to him and Eve, but he soon learns that Eve wants to be cremated instead. Meanwhile, Nick has to work an extra shift and can't take his younger sister Toni (Meagan Tandy) to a concert, so he allows Josh to take her. Nick later becomes upset when Josh and Toni sleep together.
11	"Set Visit"	Pamela Fryman	Lacey Friedman	December 11, 2017	JKL111	4.30
When Josh gets a part in a mockumentary film being shot in town, he politely asks Harry and Judy to not visit him on set like they usually do, but his parents don't listen. Meanwhile, Andrew is afraid to go clubbing with Eve because he's a terrible dancer, so he asks Nick to give him lessons.
12	"It Happened One Night"	Pamela Fryman	Austin Winsberg	December 18, 2017	JKL112	4.29
Judy and Harry hold their regular bridge night with their friends Lenore and Dick (Christina Pickles and Fred Willard). While the men get along fine, the women don't, and things come to a head when Judy accuses Lenore of cheating. Luke tells Josh he wants to break up with their spin instructor Sydney (Ginger Gonzaga), so Josh and Nick give Luke advice on how to handle the breakup so the guys don't get kicked out of the class. Meanwhile, Eve breaks her and Andrew's anniversary tradition of only getting gifts for themselves, which has Andrew scrambling to come up with a special surprise for Eve.
13	"Heavy Meddling"	Michael Shea	Stephanie Darrow	January 15, 2018	JKL114	5.21
Josh starts dating childhood acquaintance Lauren (Andrea Anders) after what he thinks is a chance encounter. Unknown to them, Judy and Lauren's mother Myra were working behind the scenes to set them up, despite Josh's explicit instructions to Judy to quit meddling in his love life. Meanwhile, Eve is afraid to have Harry babysit Wyatt by himself, so she asks Nick to keep an eye on her father-in-law while she and Andrew go out.
14	"Fridays with Harry"	Pamela Fryman	Daniel Spector	January 22, 2018	JKL113	4.72
Andrew forces Judy to get her first health checkup in five years, after which she learns she has low potassium. Despite Andrew's warnings otherwise, Judy does some self-diagnosis online and becomes convinced she's dying. Meanwhile, Harry decides to cut back on his time at the office and take Fridays off. But when he wants to spend those Fridays with Josh, his son tries to steer him in another direction.
15	"Stalker Status"	Victor Gonzalez	Lacey Friedman	January 29, 2018	JKL115	4.82
Josh is outwardly annoyed when Patty Partridge (Cheri Oteri), his former stalker from Hollywood, has apparently followed him to New York, but she says she moved there to stalk another actor. Seeing it as a sign of his career being in decline, Josh reluctantly takes Judy's advice and tries out for a Broadway play. Elsewhere, Andrew and Eve decide they are wasting too much of their precious free time watching trashy TV reality shows, so they mutually decide to read a book and then discuss it. It doesn't take long before both are wishing to be back in their comfort zone.
16	"Tell All"	Victor Gonzalez	Dana Klein & Mark Feuerstein	February 5, 2018	JKL116	4.88
Josh's ex-wife Kim (Brooke Lyons) is in town to promote the tell-all book she wrote about being married into the "dysfunctional" Roberts family. Among the family members' issues with the book, Josh is particularly mad about a passage where Kim says she wrote an apology letter to him, as he received no such letter. He has a conversation with Kim in which it becomes clear that Judy threw away the letter. Josh briefly considers getting back together with Kim and invites her to the family dinner celebrating his opening night on Broadway. But Kim's attitude during dinner convinces him they are better off apart.

== Production ==
=== Development ===
On January 17, 2017, it was announced that CBS had given the production a pilot order as 9J, 9K and 9L. The episode was written and authored by Mark Feuerstein who was expected to executive produce along with Dana Klein, Aaron Kaplan, Wendi Trilling and Dana Honor. Production companies involved with the pilot include Liscolaide Productions, Trill TV, Kapital Entertainment, and CBS Television Studios. On May 12, 2017, CBS officially ordered the pilot to series. A few days later, it was announced that the series, now titled 9JKL, would premiere on October 2, 2017 and airs on Mondays at 9:30 P.M. On November 17, 2017, CBS picked up the series for a full season of 16 episodes.

=== Casting ===
In February 2017, it was announced that David Walton, Matt Murray and Liza Lapira had been cast in the pilot's lead roles. On March 6, 2017, it was reported that both Linda Lavin and Elliott Gould had also joined the pilot's main cast. On June 19, 2017, it was announced that Albert Tsai had been cast to the regular series.

=== Cancellation ===
On May 12, 2018, it was announced that CBS officially cancelled 9JKL, along with Kevin Can Wait, Superior Donuts, Living Biblically, and Me, Myself & I. A combination of factors, including declining ratings, CBS's desire to have an ownership stake (which is contradictory, as CBS Television Studios already produces 9JKL), and the network needing to clear space for three new sitcoms in the fall 2018 schedule, led to the show's demise.

== Home media ==
The full complete series was released on DVD as for CBS Home Entertainment on November 26, 2019.

== Reception ==
The review aggregator website Rotten Tomatoes reported an approval rating of 19% based on 16 reviews. The website’s consensus reads: " Irritatingly uninspired, 9jkl leaves its talented cast out in the cold." Metacritic, which uses a weighted average, assigned a score of 37 out of 100 based on 10 critics, indicating "generally unfavorable reviews".

=== Ratings ===
Viewership and ratings per episode of 9JKL
No.	Title	Air date	Viewers (millions)
1	"Pilot"	October 2, 2017	8.21
2	"Relationship Guy"	October 9, 2017	7.04
3	"Cool Friend Luke"	October 16, 2017	6.66
4	"High Steaks"	October 23, 2017	7.17
5	"The Key to Life"	October 30, 2017	5.05
6	"TV MD"	November 6, 2017	4.36
7	"Nanny Wars"	November 13, 2017	4.33
8	"Make Thanksgiving Great Again"	November 20, 2017	4.42
9	"Lovers Getaway"	November 27, 2017	4.60
10	"The Family Plot"	December 4, 2017	4.62
11	"Set Visit"	December 11, 2017	4.30
12	"It Happened One Night"	December 18, 2017	4.29
13	"Heavy Meddling"	January 15, 2018	5.21
14	"Fridays with Harry"	January 22, 2018	4.72
15	"Stalker Status"	January 29, 2018	4.82
16	"Tell All"	February 5, 2018	4.88
