= Mayor of Kingstown =

American crime thriller television series (2021–present)

- Genre: Crime thriller
- Created by: Taylor Sheridan; Hugh Dillon
- Starring: Jeremy Renner; Dianne Wiest; Hugh Dillon; Tobi Bamtefa; Taylor Handley; Emma Laird; Derek Webster; Hamish Allan-Headley; Pha'rez Lass; Aidan Gillen; Kyle Chandler; Nishi Munshi; Michael Beach; Necar Zadegan; Laura Benanti; Lennie James; Edie Falco; David Morse
- Theme music composer: Andrew Lockington
- Country of origin: United States
- Original language: English
- No. of seasons: 4
- No. of episodes: 40

Production
- Executive producers: Taylor Sheridan; Hugh Dillon; Jeremy Renner; Antoine Fuqua; David C. Glasser; Ronald Burkle; Bob Yari; Michael Friedman
- Running time: 34–66 minutes
- Production companies: Paramount Television Studios (Note: Known as MTV Entertainment Studios for seasons 1–3); Bosque Ranch Productions; 101 Studios; Square Head Pictures

Original release
- Network: Paramount+
- Release: November 14, 2021 – present

Mayor of Kingstown is an American crime thriller television series created by Taylor Sheridan and Hugh Dillon and starring Jeremy Renner. The series premiered on November 14, 2021, on Paramount+. In February 2022, the series was renewed for a second season, which premiered on January 15, 2023. In September 2023, the series was renewed for a third season, which premiered on June 2, 2024. In December 2024, the series was renewed for a fourth season, which premiered on October 26, 2025. In January 2026, the series was renewed for a fifth and final season, which is due to premiere on January 15, 2027.

== Premise ==
Located in the U.S. state of Michigan, the city of Kingstown is a fictional company town where the business is incarceration. The McLusky family have been keeping the peace in Kingstown for decades, acting as the mediators between the street gangs, prisoners, guards, and cops. Tackling themes of racism, corruption, mental illness, and violence, the series provides a stark look at their attempt to bring order and justice to a town that has neither.

== Cast and characters ==
=== Main ===
- Jeremy Renner as Michael "Mike" McLusky, the right-hand man for his older brother, Mitch; he takes over as "Mayor" after Mitch's death in the first episode. The middle McLusky brother, Mike has spent much of his life dreaming of getting out of Kingstown. He was once an inmate in the Kingstown prison who rose to the rank of "shot-caller" for the white inmates.
- Dianne Wiest as Mariam McLusky (seasons 1–2), the mother of the McLusky brothers. Mariam is a college history professor who volunteers to teach inmates in the town's female prison. Mariam is fully aware of her sons' activities and harbors animosity toward Mike.
- Hugh Dillon as Lieutenant Ian Ferguson, a seasoned, hard-nosed detective for the Kingstown Police Department and Kyle's partner. Dillon is also one of the show's co-creators.
- Tobi Bamtefa as Deverin "Bunny" Washington, the leader of the Crips in Kingstown, and a drug dealer who does business out in the open. Bunny has a good relationship with Mike and is the closest thing to a friend that Mike has.
- Taylor Handley as Lieutenant Kyle McLusky, the youngest of the McLusky brothers and a detective for the Kingstown Police Department. Kyle often struggles with the choices he is forced to make assisting his older brothers, and with his fellow officers' questionable tactics. During the second season, he begins working as a Michigan State Police Trooper.
- Emma Laird as Iris (seasons 1–3), a smooth-talking escort who works for Milo and the Russian mafia to seduce and bribe government officials. Iris is originally brought into Kingstown in an attempt to control Mike.
- Derek Webster as Stevie, a Kingstown Police detective and an ally of the McLusky brothers
- Hamish Allan-Headley as Robert Sawyer (seasons 1–4), a police sergeant who leads an elite team of Kingstown SWAT officers. Sawyer is a force of nature who does whatever is necessary, which includes operating his team as more of a death squad.
- Pha'rez Lass as P-Dog (season 1), a "shot-caller" and leader of the Crip inmates in Kingstown Prison. He leads a prison riot in retaliation against the guards for their ill treatment.
- Aidan Gillen as Milo Sunter (seasons 1–3), a Russian mobster imprisoned for life after killing guards in an armored car robbery
- Kyle Chandler as Mitchell "Mitch" McLusky (season 1), the oldest of the McLusky brothers, who took over the role of "Mayor" after their father died
- Nishi Munshi as Tracy McLusky (seasons 2–4; recurring season 1), Kyle's wife, who is pregnant with their son
- Michael Beach as Captain Kareem Moore (season 3; recurring seasons 1–2), the leader of the Kingstown Prison guards. During the second season, he is promoted to interim warden.
- Necar Zadegan as Evelyn Foley (season 4; recurring seasons 1–3), the assistant district attorney for the city of Kingstown, who is secretly having an affair with Mike
- Laura Benanti as Cindy Stephens (season 4), a rookie corrections officer and single mother
- Lennie James as Frank Moses (season 4), a respected gangster from Detroit who allies with Bunny to take control of Kingstown
- Edie Falco as Nina Hobbs (season 4), the newly appointed warden at Kingstown prison
- David Morse as Russell Hardy (season 5)

=== Recurring ===
- Nichole Galicia as Rebecca, who works as a secretary for Mitch and then later for Mike
- James Jordan as Ed Simmons (season 1), a corrections sergeant who helps coordinate with Mike and Mitch in dealing with the inmates
- Jason E. Kelley as Tim Weaver (season 1), a corrections officer and an ally of Mike and Mitch
- George Tchortov as Joseph (seasons 1–2), Milo's right-hand man and leader of the Russian mafia operating in Kingstown. It is later revealed during the second season that Joseph was secretly having an affair with Tatiana behind Milo's back, resulting in them having a child together.
- Ryan Rosery as Latrell (season 1)
- Mandela Van Peebles as Sam (season 1), Tim's nephew, and a rookie corrections officer, whose actions cause chaos within and outside the prison
- Adam Clark as Warden Mills (season 1)
- Jose Pablo Cantillo as Carlos Jiménez (season 1), a high-ranking leader in the Mexican Mafia. Carlos also served time with Mike in the Kingstown prison back when he was a "Shot-Caller" for the whites.
- Andrew Howard as Duke (season 1), the leader of a local Aryan Brotherhood chapter in Kingstown, who also controls the White inmates inside the prison. Duke once served time alongside Mike in the Kingstown prison, both as acting "Shot-Callers".
- Brandon Keel as Ruger (season 1)
- Derek Basco as Keno (seasons 1, 3–4; guest season 2)
- Rob Stewart as Captain Richard Heard (season 1; guest season 2), the captain of detectives in the Kingstown Police Department
- Natasha Marc as Cherry Maxwell (seasons 1, 3), a young 20-year-old inmate in the female prison and one of Mariam's students
- Rob Kirkland as Captain Walter (seasons 1, 4; guest season 3), the captain of police in the Kingstown Police Department
- Stacie Greenwell as Abby Steele (season 1), a seasoned corrections officer assigned to the female prison
- Lane Garrison as Carney (seasons 2–4), a Kingstown prison guard who takes over the role that his predecessor Ed Simmons filled after his death
- Phil Rice as Digo (season 2–present)
- Dylan Kenin as Gunner (season 2; guest season 3)
- Marcus L. Brandon as Dedrick (season 2; guest season 3)
- D Smoke as Raphael Johnson (season 2–present)
- Gratiela Brancusi as Tatiana Sonovitchka (season 2; guest season 3), an escort that works for Milo and the Russian mafia. She is also the mother of Joseph's child
- Ash Santos as Coco (season 2; guest season 3)
- Kenny Johnson as Charlie Pickings (seasons 2–3), a convicted serial killer who provides information for Ian Furgeson
- Matt Gerald as Davidson (season 2)
- Nona Parker Johnson as Rhonda (season 3; guest season 2)
- Mark McKinnon as Donnell Costa (season 3; guest season 2)
- Yorick van Wageningen as Konstantin Noskov (season 3)
- Mark Ivanir as Roman (season 3)
- Richard Brake as Merle Callahan (seasons 3–4), a former prisoner transferred back to Kingstown Prison
- Denny Love as Kevin Jackson (seasons 3–4)
- Jessica Steen as Sarah (season 3–present)
- Paula Malcomson as Anna Fletcher (season 3)
- B. Todd Johnston as Norseman (season 3–present)
- Corey Ronald Walter as Mullen (season 3–present)
- Bria Condon as Alex (season 3)
- Benny Mora as Thomas (season 3)
- Matthew Del Negro as Will Breen (seasons 3–4)
- Patrick Cage as Cole (season 3–present)
- William Guirola as Roberto Cruz (season 4; guest season 3)
- Clayton Cardenas as David Torres (season 4)
- Niko Nicotera as Todd Shaver (season 4)
- Derek Rivera as Cortez (season 4)
- Verlon Brown as Lawrence "LJ" James (season 4)
- Derrick J. Smith as Derrick Costa (season 4)
- Zuri James as Lamar Miller (season 4)
- John Cenatiempo as Clyde (season 4)
- Mickey O'Sullivan as Billy (season 4)
- Khalilah Joi as Whitney Washington (season 4)
- Johnny Dinan as Pete "Pyro" McDonough (season 4)
- Néstor Carbonell as Enrique Molina (season 5)

== Episodes ==
| Season | Episodes | Originally released | |
| Season | Episodes | First released | Last released |
|---|---|---|---|
| 1 | 10 | November 14, 2021 | January 9, 2022 |
| 2 | 10 | January 15, 2023 | March 19, 2023 |
| 3 | 10 | June 2, 2024 | August 4, 2024 |
| 4 | 10 | October 26, 2025 | December 28, 2025 |
| 5 | 8 | January 15, 2027 | March 5, 2027 |

=== Season 1 (2021–22) ===
| No. overall | No. in season | Title | Directed by | Written by | Original release date |
|---|---|---|---|---|---|
| 1 | 1 | "The Mayor of Kingstown" | Taylor Sheridan | Story by : Taylor Sheridan & Hugh Dillon; Teleplay by : Taylor Sheridan | November 14, 2021 |
| 2 | 2 | "The End Begins" | Ben Richardson | Taylor Sheridan | November 14, 2021 |
| 3 | 3 | "Simply Murder" | Taylor Sheridan | Taylor Sheridan | November 21, 2021 |
| 4 | 4 | "The Price" | Ben Richardson | Taylor Sheridan | November 28, 2021 |
| 5 | 5 | "Orion" | Guy Ferland | Taylor Sheridan | December 5, 2021 |
| 6 | 6 | "Every Feather" | Guy Ferland | Taylor Sheridan | December 12, 2021 |
| 7 | 7 | "Along Came a Spider" | Clark Johnson | Taylor Sheridan | December 19, 2021 |
| 8 | 8 | "The Devil Is Us" | Clark Johnson | Taylor Sheridan | December 26, 2021 |
| 9 | 9 | "The Lie of the Truth" | Stephen Kay | Taylor Sheridan | January 2, 2022 |
| 10 | 10 | "This Piece of My Soul" | Stephen Kay | Taylor Sheridan | January 9, 2022 |

=== Season 2 (2023) ===
| No. overall | No. in season | Title | Directed by | Written by | Original release date |
|---|---|---|---|---|---|
| 11 | 1 | "Never Missed a Pigeon" | Stephen Kay | Dave Erickson and Taylor Sheridan | January 15, 2023 |
| 12 | 2 | "Staring at the Devil" | Stephen Kay | Taylor Sheridan | January 22, 2023 |
| 13 | 3 | "Five at Five" | Tasha Smith | Keli Goff | January 29, 2023 |
| 14 | 4 | "The Pool" | Tasha Smith | Evan Ball | February 5, 2023 |
| 15 | 5 | "Kill Box" | Guy Ferland | Leon Hendrix III | February 12, 2023 |
| 16 | 6 | "Left with the Nose" | Guy Ferland | Christian Donovan | February 19, 2023 |
| 17 | 7 | "Drones" | Stephen Kay | Regina Corrado | February 26, 2023 |
| 18 | 8 | "Santa Jesus" | Stephen Kay | Hugh Dillon & Stephen Kay | March 5, 2023 |
| 19 | 9 | "Peace in the Valley" | Stephen Kay | Christian Donovan & James Arcega Tinsley | March 12, 2023 |
| 20 | 10 | "Little Green Ant" | Stephen Kay | Regina Corrado & Dave Erickson | March 19, 2023 |

=== Season 3 (2024) ===
| No. overall | No. in season | Title | Directed by | Written by | Original release date |
|---|---|---|---|---|---|
| 21 | 1 | "Soldier's Heart" | Christoph Schrewe | Dave Erickson | June 2, 2024 |
| 22 | 2 | "Guts" | Christoph Schrewe | Regina Corrado | June 9, 2024 |
| 23 | 3 | "Barbarians at the Gate" | Nina Lopez-Corrado | Wendy Riss | June 16, 2024 |
| 24 | 4 | "Rag Doll" | Nina Lopez-Corrado | Aalia Brown | June 23, 2024 |
| 25 | 5 | "Iris" | Paul Cameron | Christian Donovan | June 30, 2024 |
| 26 | 6 | "Ecotone" | Paul Cameron | James Arcega Tinsley | July 7, 2024 |
| 27 | 7 | "Marya Was Here" | Guy Ferland | Wendy Riss & Molly Forman | July 14, 2024 |
| 28 | 8 | "Captain of the Shit Out of Luck" | Guy Ferland | Hugh Dillon | July 21, 2024 |
| 29 | 9 | "Home on the Range" | Christoph Schrewe | Regina Corrado & Jeremiah Wessling | July 28, 2024 |
| 30 | 10 | "Comeuppance" | Christoph Schrewe | Dave Erickson | August 4, 2024 |

=== Season 4 (2025) ===
| No. overall | No. in season | Title | Directed by | Written by | Original release date |
|---|---|---|---|---|---|
| 31 | 1 | "Coming 'Round the Mountain" | Christoph Schrewe | Dave Erickson | October 26, 2025 |
| 32 | 2 | "Promises to Keep" | Christoph Schrewe | Aalia Brown | November 2, 2025 |
| 33 | 3 | "People Who Died" | Leslie Hope | Christian Donovan | November 9, 2025 |
| 34 | 4 | "Sins of Omission" | Leslie Hope | James Arcega Tinsley | November 16, 2025 |
| 35 | 5 | "Damned" | Christoph Schrewe | Wendy Riss | November 23, 2025 |
| 36 | 6 | "#081693" | Christoph Schrewe | Molly Forman | November 30, 2025 |
| 37 | 7 | "My Way" | Guy Ferland | Christian Donovan & Jeremiah Wessling | December 7, 2025 |
| 38 | 8 | "Belleville" | Guy Ferland | Wendy Riss | December 14, 2025 |
| 39 | 9 | "Teeth and Tissue" | Christoph Schrewe | Hugh Dillon | December 21, 2025 |
| 40 | 10 | "Belly of the Beast" | Christoph Schrewe | Dave Erickson | December 28, 2025 |

=== Season 5 ===
| No. overall | No. in season | Title | Directed by | Written by | Original release date |
|---|---|---|---|---|---|
| 41 | 1 | TBA | TBA | Dave Erickson | January 15, 2027 |
| 42 | 2 | TBA | TBA | Aalia Brown | January 22, 2027 |
| 43 | 3 | TBA | TBA | Christian Donovan | January 29, 2027 |
| 44 | 4 | TBA | TBA | James Arcega Tinsley | February 5, 2027 |
| 45 | 5 | TBA | TBA | Wendy Riss | February 12, 2027 |
| 46 | 6 | TBA | TBA | Regina Corrado | February 19, 2027 |
| 47 | 7 | TBA | TBA | Molly Forman | February 26, 2027 |
| 48 | 8 | TBA | TBA | Hugh Dillon & Dave Erickson | March 5, 2027 |

== Production ==
The project was first announced in January 2020, when Paramount Network ordered the series. By February 2021, the series was transferred over to the Paramount+ streaming service, with Jeremy Renner cast to star. The next month, Dianne Wiest joined the cast, with Emma Laird, Derek Webster and Taylor Handley added in April. Series co-creator Hugh Dillon joined the cast alongside Pha'rez Lass and Tobi Bamtefa in May. Kyle Chandler was revealed to have joined the cast in August following the release of a teaser poster for the series, while Aidan Gillen and Hamish Allan-Headley were added to the main cast.

Filming on the first season took place from May 17 to October 4, 2021, at Stratagem Studios in Toronto, Hamilton, Ontario, Burlington, Ontario and in Kingston, Ontario, mainly the Kingston Penitentiary. Andrew Lockington composed the music for the series, and the soundtrack was released by Lakeshore Records.

On February 1, 2022, Paramount+ renewed the series for a second season. In June 2022, filming for the second season took place at the Lampe Marina and Presque Isle Bay near Erie, Pennsylvania. On September 6, 2023, Paramount+ renewed the series for a third season, which began filming in Pittsburgh on January 10, 2024.

On December 18, 2024, Paramount+ renewed the series for a fourth season. By August 2025, during the production of the fourth season, Paramount Television Studios had taken over production of the series following the merger of MTV Entertainment Studios' parent company Paramount Global with Skydance Media into Paramount Skydance. On January 5, 2026, the series was renewed for a fifth and final season by Paramount+ with a shorter 8-episode order. On March 13, 2026, David Morse joined the cast as a series regular for the fifth and final as production begins in Pittsburgh, Pennsylvania.

== Release ==
The ten-episode first season of Mayor of Kingstown premiered on November 14, 2021, on Paramount+. The first two episodes had their linear premiere on November 21 and 28, 2021 on Paramount Network, where it was originally supposed to air. The second season premiered on January 15, 2023. The third season premiered on June 2, 2024. The fourth season premiered on October 26, 2025. The fifth and final season is due to premiere on January 15, 2027.

== Reception ==
For the first season, the review aggregator website Rotten Tomatoes reported a 33% approval by 27 critics, with an average rating of 5.6/10. The website's critics consensus reads, "Despite campaigning with a strong pedigree, Mayor of Kingstown botches its reelection chances by giving constituents too much gloom and grit and not enough reasons to care." Metacritic, which uses a weighted average, assigned a score of 54 out of 100 based on 15 critics, indicating "mixed or average reviews".

During its debut in the US, which was simulcast on cable as a means of promotion, the series drew 2.6 million viewers linearly, making it Paramount Network's most-watched scripted premiere since 2018.

Rotten Tomatoes reported a 50% approval by 8 critics for the second season, with an average rating of 5/10. Metacritic assigned a score of 60 out of 100 based on 4 critics, indicating "mixed or average reviews".

The third season has an approval rating of 78% on Rotten Tomatoes, based on 9 critic reviews, with an average rating of 6.6/10.

The fourth season has an approval rating of 100% on Rotten Tomatoes, based on 5 critic reviews.
