= Charlie Says (2018 film) =

2018 American biographical drama film by Mary Harron

- Theatrical release poster
- Directed by: Mary Harron
- Written by: Guinevere Turner
- Based on: The Family: The Story of Charles Manson's Dune Buggy Attack Battalion by: Ed Sanders; The Long Prison Journey of Leslie Van Houten; Karlene Faith
- Produced by: Cindi Rice; Jeremy M. Rosen; John Frank Rosenblum
- Starring: Julia Schlaepfer; Hannah Murray; Sosie Bacon; Marianne Rendón; Merritt Wever; Suki Waterhouse; Chace Crawford; Annabeth Gish; Matt Smith
- Cinematography: Crille Forsberg
- Edited by: Andrew Hafitz
- Music by: Keegan DeWitt
- Production companies: Epic Level Entertainment; Roxwell Films
- Distributed by: IFC Films
- Release dates: September 2, 2018 (Venice); May 10, 2019 (United States)
- Running time: 110 minutes
- Country: United States
- Language: English
- Box office: $108,529

Charlie Says is a 2018 American biographical drama film directed by Mary Harron and starring Hannah Murray as Leslie Van Houten and Matt Smith as infamous cult leader Charles Manson.

It had its world premiere at the 75th Venice International Film Festival on September 2, 2018, and was released on May 10, 2019, by IFC Films.

== Plot ==
The film tells the story of Leslie "Lulu" Van Houten's life in the Manson Family cult and Karlene Faith's work to deprogram her, Patricia "Katie" Krenwinkel, and Susan "Sadie" Atkins after they were imprisoned for their involvement in the Tate and LaBianca murders. It interweaves scenes from various time periods.

In the opening scene, Lulu slowly showers blood off her face after the LaBianca murders. Three years later, Lulu, Katie, and Sadie are in the Special Security Unit at the California Institution for Women. Karlene Faith, a University of California, Santa Cruz graduate student, is assigned to teach them college classes. Lulu, Katie, and Sadie are unusually gentle, polite, and welcoming, in contrast to what she expects of convicted murderers. As Karlene gets acquainted with them, she sees that their belief systems were set for them by Charles "Charlie" Manson, whom they adore: she wants to change that.

The film flashes back to Lulu's introduction to the Family and Charlie at Spahn Ranch. Fulfilling Charlie's requests for new recruits, Catherine "Gypsy" Share brings Lulu to the ranch. Katie becomes Lulu's mentor. Katie explains Charlie and the Family's beliefs. The group follows Charlie's preaching, instructing them to let go of their egos, live in the now, and be free about sex. Drugs are handed out to everyone. The members of the Family are happy and loving to each other. That evening, Lulu witnesses a deeply emotional scene involving another Family member, Sandy. In front of the group, Charlie tears down Sandy's personality and relationship with her parents and then constructs her a new interpretation of herself, sealing the deal with group affirmation. Returning from the flashback, Lulu tells Karlene that every girl should have a daddy like Charlie. Incredulous, Karlene thinks that Lulu, Katie, and Sadie have been brainwashed and offers them copies of Our Bodies, Ourselves and Sisterhood is Powerful.

Some days, Charlie sends the women out to panhandle and hunt through dumpsters for food. Some nights, he oversees Family orgies. He makes the rules for the group: women cannot hold money and aren't allowed to serve themselves food until the men at the table have served themselves. After Lulu sees Charlie callously disregard the pain of a crying Family member, he explains his philosophy that the members of his group are trying to let go of their materialistic culture, to submit, and to get rid of their egos and hang-ups. He says that there has to be some death of self. He then has sex with Lulu, and tells her to think of it "like making love to her daddy", which he believes "is what all the girls want but can never have".

In various scenes, Lulu is chastised for questioning the inconsistencies in Charlie's mandates. In one scene, he takes her to a cliff and tells her that if she wants to leave the ranch, then she must jump. Charlie believes that some passages in the Book of Revelation refer to him and that he will lead mankind after a revolution caused by a race war. Lulu, Katie, and Sadie tell Karlene about Charlie's belief that they will wait out the revolution in a bottomless pit and that when it is over, some will become winged elves who fly to the surface. Karlene tries to get them to think rationally instead of believing what Charlie taught them, but they still are not able to do so.

In another flashback, Dennis Wilson tells Charlie that the Beach Boys will record one of Charlie's songs, "Cease to Exist". Elated, Charlie thinks that he is going to be a rock star. When record producer Terry Melcher sees Charlie and his backup singers perform "Look at Your Game, Girl", he is not impressed. This makes Charlie furious and, later that evening, he beats Sadie.

His focus shifts from music to violence. He decides to kick-start the race war by killing some white people and blaming the killings on African Americans. He calls this "Helter Skelter". He orders Sadie and Tex to go to Terry Melcher's old house, now occupied by pregnant actress Sharon Tate, to kill the residents. They are accompanied by Katie and Linda Kasabian.

After the Tate murders, Charlie orders Katie, Tex, and Lulu to commit the LaBianca murders. Following Charlie's teaching, Tex believes they can become invisible at will.

Karlene wants to give Lulu, Katie, and Sadie back their own selves from the time before they met Charlie. However, as time goes by, she realizes that when Lulu, Katie, and Sadie are able to think for themselves again, they will realize how wrong the murders were. The murders were irrevocable and they will torment Lulu, Katie, and Sadie for the rest of their lives. The final scenes show Lulu realizing that the murders would not bring about a revolution, but, instead were for nothing.

== Cast ==
- Hannah Murray as Leslie "Lulu" Van Houten
- Matt Smith as Charles Manson
- Sosie Bacon as Patricia "Katie" Krenwinkel
- Marianne Rendón as Susan "Sadie" Atkins
- Merritt Wever as Karlene Faith
- Suki Waterhouse as Mary Brunner
- Chace Crawford as Charles "Tex" Watson
- Annabeth Gish as Virginia Carlson
- Kayli Carter as Lynette "Squeaky" Fromme
- Grace Van Dien as Sharon Tate
- Bridger Zadina as Paul Watkins
- Julia Schlaepfer as Sandra Good
- Dayle McLeod as Catherine "Gypsy" Share
- India Ennenga as Linda Kasabian
- Cameron Gellman as Bobby Beausoleil
- Bryan Adrian as Terry Melcher
- James Trevena Brown as Dennis Wilson

== Inspiration ==
The film is based on the books The Family, by Ed Sanders, and The Long Prison Journey of Leslie Van Houten, by Karlene Faith.

The film documents the work of Faith with the Manson women, Susan Atkins, Patricia Krenwinkel, and Leslie Van Houten, at the California Institution for Women, in the mid-1970s.

It shows how Faith, as a graduate student, helped the Manson women come to understand the magnitude of their crimes, and eventually renounce Charles Manson.

== Production ==
In January 2016, Mary Harron and Guinevere Turner were announced to be directing and writing a film based on the life and crimes of Charles Manson and his followers.

In February 2018, the casting began, with Matt Smith cast to play Manson, and Hannah Murray, Odessa Young, Marianne Rendón, Merritt Wever, Carla Gugino, Kayli Carter and Suki Waterhouse among the supporting cast. Chace Crawford and Sosie Bacon were cast in March 2018, with Gugino no longer set to star in the film. Annabeth Gish joined the film in April.

== Release ==
It had its world premiere at the Venice Film Festival on September 2, 2018. Shortly after, IFC Films acquired U.S. distribution rights to the film, beating out A24, Momentum Pictures and RLJE Films in a bidding war. It was released on May 10, 2019.

== Reception ==
On the review aggregation website Rotten Tomatoes, the film holds an approval rating of 59%, based on 74 reviews, with an average rating of 6.1/10. The site's consensus states: "Charlie Says approaches its infamous subject from a welcome new angle, but suffers from a disappointing lack of depth in its treatment of the story." On Metacritic, the film holds a rating of 57 out of 100, based on 21 critics, indicating "mixed or average" reviews.
