= Imposters (TV series) =

American black comedy television series

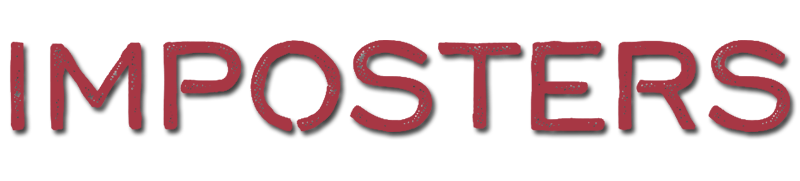
- Genre: Dark comedy
- Created by: Adam Brooks; Paul Adelstein
- Starring: Inbar Lavi; Rob Heaps; Parker Young; Marianne Rendón; Stephen Bishop; Brian Benben; Katherine LaNasa
- Composers: Talia Osteen; Dov Rosenblatt
- Country of origin: United States
- Original language: English
- No. of seasons: 2
- No. of episodes: 20

Production
- Executive producers: Adam Brooks; Paul Adelstein
- Camera setup: Single-camera
- Running time: 40–45 minutes
- Production companies: Villa Walk Productions; Riverrun Films; Universal Cable Productions

Original release
- Network: Bravo
- Release: February 7, 2017 – June 7, 2018

Imposters is an American dark comedy television series. The show premiered February 7, 2017, on the Bravo cable network with a 10-episode season. Announced in April 2015 as My So Called Wife, the series follows con artist Maddie, played by Inbar Lavi, who gets involved in relationships with men and women before leaving them "used and robbed of everything – including their hearts". On April 17, 2017, Bravo renewed the series for a second season, which premiered on April 5, 2018. On June 1, 2018, Bravo canceled the series after two seasons.

== Premise ==
Maddie Jonson (Inbar Lavi) is a con artist who works with Max (Brian Benben) and Sally (Katherine LaNasa) at the behest of a mysterious figure called "The Doctor" (Ray Proscia) who has teams of con artists working for him in multiple cities. The trio's method of operation is to make their targets (male or female) fall in love with Maddie while inserting themselves into their lives, and then steal all their valuables shortly after she marries the victim. After Ezra Bloom (Rob Heaps) becomes the latest victim of their con, he is visited by Richard Evans (Parker Young), one of Maddie's previous targets, who is looking for her. The two travel to a former address of Maddie's only to find Jules Langmore (Marianne Rendón), an artist who also was married to and conned by Maddie. The three decide to team up and look for Maddie, but the lack of funds for travel requires them to become con artists themselves.

== Cast ==
=== Main ===
- Inbar Lavi as Maddie Jonson/Ava/Alice/CeCe/Saffron/Molly, a career con-artist working for the mysterious and dangerous Doctor who wants out after cons begin to take a toll on her
- Rob Heaps as Ezra Bloom, Maddie's latest conned husband who launches a plot to track her down and get his money back
- Parker Young as Richard Evans, Maddie's former husband and fellow conned ex. He tracks down Ezra while looking for Maddie and they launch an investigation together.
- Marianne Rendón as Julia "Jules" Langmore, Maddie's former conned wife who comes from a rich family, from whom Maddie stole money. She joins Ezra and Richard's investigation into Maddie’s crimes.
- Stephen Bishop as Patrick Campbell, an undercover FBI agent who becomes entangled with Maddie
- Brian Benben as Max, Maddie's co-worker who is in charge of the technicalities of conning lovers
- Katherine LaNasa as Sally (season 2; recurring in season 1), who initially worked with Maddie and Max while wanting to run away, but later became a lethal enforcer for the Doctor

=== Recurring ===
- Ray Proscia as Jeffrey Hull/The Doctor, the mysterious and dangerous man in charge of the con game
- Uma Thurman as Lenny Cohen, The Doctor's assassin who "takes care" of people who are "not doing their jobs"
- Denise Dowse as Auntie Colleen / Agent Cook, Patrick's FBI agent boss who poses as his aunt
- Adam Korson as Josh Bloom, Ezra's dimwitted brother
- Mary Kay Place as Marsha Bloom, Ezra's innocent and good-natured mother
- Mark Harelik as Arthur Bloom, Ezra's dishonest father
- Aaron Douglas as Gary Heller (season 1), Maddie's short tempered con who is well aware of the mysterious Doctor
- Paul Adelstein as Shelly Cohen (season 2), Lenny's husband who is also one of the Doctor's assassins
- Laura Archbold as Sophia/Rosa (season 2), Ezra's new love interest who is a fellow con-artist that he meets in Mexico
- Rachel Skarsten as Poppy Langmore (season 2), Jules' uptight, rich sister who takes a liking to Richard when he learns Maddie modeled Alice after her
- Anne-Marie Johnson as Gail (season 2), Maddie's therapist at a luxury retreat center

=== Guest ===
- Megan Park as Gaby
- Jaime Ray Newman as Linda, a woman who Maddie meets at a self-help center
- Griffin Dunne as Herman, a man who helps the Bumblers in Mexico City when they need fake passports
- Mauricio de Montellano as Federale, a mexican cop who helps the FBI find the Bumblers while they hide from the police in Mexico
- Mikey Madison as young Maddie (2 episodes)
- Abby Miller as Charlotte (2 episodes)

== Episodes ==
=== Series overview ===
Season	Episodes	Originally released	
Season	Episodes	First released	Last released
1	10	February 7, 2017	April 11, 2017
2	10	April 5, 2018	June 7, 2018

=== Season 1 (2017) ===
No. overall	No. in season	Title	Directed by	Written by	Original release date	Prod. code	U.S. viewers (millions)
1	1	"My So-Called Wife"	Adam Brooks	Adam Brooks & Paul Adelstein	February 7, 2017	101	0.655
Ezra Bloom is newly married to Ava and works successfully in the family business until his whole life breaks down when Ava disappears with all his savings and turns out to be a con artist. Ezra is devastated until Richard appears, who also fell victim to Ava. Together they go in search of her. Ava, with her real name Maddie Jonson, is already preparing with her accomplices Max and Sally for the next assignment, which Max gets from their dangerous boss, the "Doctor": Maddie has to con banker Gary Heller in Seattle.
2	2	"My Balls, Dickhead"	Adam Brooks	Kathy Greenberg & Emily Cook	February 14, 2017	102	0.621
Maddie starts as an assistant to Heller at the bank and gets closer to him, while Sal finds large amounts of cash in his house as a cleaning lady and Max gains access to Heller's computer as an IT expert. Ezra and Richard are running out of money in search of Maddie, so they try themselves to trick others. They only steal from people who deserve it in their opinion and soon find it appealing. When they finally arrive at the destination of their search, they don't meet Maddie, but another victim of Maddie, this time a woman.
3	3	"We Wanted Every Lie"	Adam Brooks	Andy Parker	February 21, 2017	103	0.627
The artist Jules, who is still suffers mentally from the marriage fraud, turns out to be a talented con artist and joins the search for Maddie. Together, the three of them discover Maddie's home town and drive there. Meanwhile, Maddie falls in love with the chance acquaintance Patrick, a tech millionaire, neglects her work and rejects Heller's advances against her orders. Max finds out that Heller's betraying the doctor on money laundering. The doctor then orders that Heller be completely destroyed. Besides, he's worried about Maddie and puts the tough Lenny Cohen on her.
4	4	"Cohen. Lenny Cohen."	Adam Brooks	Adam Brooks & Paul Adelstein	February 28, 2017	104	0.745
Jules and Richard introduce themselves to Maddie's mother as acquaintances of Maddie. Meanwhile, Ezra explores the house and meets the demented father, from whom he steals a cell phone. They can use it to locate Maddie's position in Seattle. Heller surprises Maddie when she dates Patrick and doesn't trust her anymore. Lenny Cohen visits Maddie and urges her to do her job more conscientiously. Heller notices that Sal has found his money, he suspects that she is working for the doctor and it becomes a fight. Maddie finds Heller dead and Sal bloody with Heller's money and sends Sal away.
5	5	"Is a Shark Good or Bad?"	Adam Brooks	Adam Brooks & Paul Adelstein	March 7, 2017	105	0.701
Ezra, Richard and Jules are using short cons to raise money for the trip to Seattle. Lenny Cohen cleans up the crime scene, Maddie leaves a false trail at work, that Heller has absconded abroad with embezzled money, and Max finally finds Sal, who wants to flee with Heller's money and Max. He pretends to be fleeing with her, but instead delivers her into the arms of the deadly enforcer Lenny Cohen, who takes her away. Meanwhile, Maddie is looking for consolation from Patrick. In the morning Max welcomes her with a new doctor's assignment: Maddie has to con Patrick. She resists, but her life is threatened by the doctor. When later she is alone in a diner booth, she is surprised by the sudden presence of Ezra, Richard and Jules.
6	6	"The Maddie Code"	Marta Cunningham	Neena Beber	March 14, 2017	106	0.872
Ezra, Richard and Jules demand their money from Maddie. But she manages to escape. The three of them watch Maddie with Patrick and decide to get their money back if Maddie cons Patrick. They appear at Patrick's party and pretend to know Maddie. But Max arrives, threatens them and breaks Richard's finger. When the three of them leave, Ezra is told that his father has had a heart attack and he rushes home. Richard decides to warn Patrick about Maddie. When he pursues him in order to deliver the warning, however, he learns that Patrick and his supposed family are all FBI agents.
7	7	"Frog-Bikini-Eiffel Tower"	Wayne Yip	Sheila Lawrence	March 21, 2017	107	0.804
Ezra's father decided to hand over the family business to his sons. However, Ezra decides against the offer and returns. Meanwhile, Richard and Jules fear possibly being under surveillance of the FBI and seek advice from lawyers. Patrick takes Maddie on an opulent vacation with him. There he proposes to her and presents a precious engagement ring. She doesn't accept his proposal because she has genuine feelings for him. She instead proposes that they run away together, but Patrick rejects this.
8	8	"In the Game"	Wayne Yip	Kathy Greenberg & Emily Cook	March 28, 2017	108	0.637
Ezra, Richard and Jules tell Maddie that Patrick is an FBI agent. She initially wants to flee, but then comes up with another plan. Maddie suggests that Patrick makes a deal: the wedding should take place and the doctor shall be lured to the wedding with 500,000 dollars bait from the FBI, which Heller supposedly left behind. In return, Maddie wants immunity and to start a new life. In reality, however, together with Max she is teaching Ezra, Richard and Jules to steal from the FBI, pay off the doctor and then flee from the FBI. But then Ezra gets arrested by the FBI for fraud.
9	9	"Ladies and Gentlemen, The Doctor Is In"	Paul Adelstein	Andy Parker	April 4, 2017	109	0.805
Ezra makes a deal with the FBI to spy on Maddie. Actually he's pretending to cooperate with the FBI while secretly working with Maddie. Preparations are underway for the big coup at the wedding. They make the FBI think the doctor is coming to the wedding, but it will instead be Max pretending to be the doctor. Jules is working on an art piece that will cleverly help switch the money cases. Max trains Richard to break into and disable cars; they grow closer in the process. Maddie is shocked to discover that Max must have betrayed Sally to Lenny and the Doctor.
10	10	"Always Forward, Never Back"	Adam Brooks	Adam Brooks & Paul Adelstein	April 11, 2017	110	0.801
The wedding day arrives and the plan goes into action. There are many FBI agents at the wedding. During the ceremony, the FBI's briefcase supposedly is switched using Jules art piece, and Max (in disguise as the Doctor) later drives away with it, successfully escaping due to Richard's having disabled all the FBI agents' cars. Maddie escapes with the help of Jules and Ezra. It later turns out that Max and Maddie had planned to betray the other three and use the money to assuage the doctor. But as revenge for Sally, Maddie instead deceives Max; it is revealed that the briefcase was never actually switched and the FBI still has the money, leaving Max with nothing. Meanwhile, Maddie goes to steal the engagement ring from Patrick's safe, however, it is already gone. Ezra, Richard and Jules wait at a bus stop for Maddie and Max, but neither show up, and the three leave on a bus for San Francisco. Unbeknownst to them, Maddie did actually show up, but didn't get on the bus and rather watched them leave. While on the bus Ezra reveals that he has the ring, which he stole while everyone was busy heading to the church. The end scene shows Lenny Cohen receiving a call from the doctor, ordering her to find Maddie and Max as well as Ezra, Jules and Richard.

=== Season 2 (2018) ===
No. overall	No. in season	Title	Directed by	Written by	Original release date	Prod. code	U.S. viewers (millions)
11	1	"Fillion Bollar King"	Adam Brooks	Jeremy Boxen	April 5, 2018	201	0.441
The Bumblers head to Richard's hometown to sell the ring. Richard's old girlfriend, who is now a police deputy, fortunately interrupts the sale-gone-bad while pursuing Ezra, having recognized him on an FBI wanted poster. The trio are forced to go to Mexico, where Richard confesses en route that he doesn't have the ring, as he hid it as a safety precaution for the risky sale. This means that they are broke. Patrick is now considered a joke at the FBI, banished to a low-level office and out of the investigation. Maddie sets herself up in a small town hoping to finally live a quiet life, but Lenny's ex-husband, the equally ruthless Shelly, appears at her door.
12	2	"Trouble Maybe"	Adam Brooks	Adam Brooks & Paul Adelstein	April 12, 2018	202	0.394
In Mexico, Richard and Jules are troubled by how enthusiastically Ezra is jumping into various con games, and are worried he is becoming as bad as Maddie. Ezra also flirts with pickpocket Rosa. Maddie injures Shelly badly and flees to a wholistic health center to hide out. Max goes to the Doctor for a second chance. He is confronted by someone with a gun: a very much alive Sally.
13	3	"Old Unresolved Sh*t"	April Mullen	Andy Parker	April 19, 2018	203	0.397
Shelly escapes from the hospital. Sally is revealed to now be working as one of the Doctor's enforcers. Jules and Richard are upset to find Ezra with Rosa. Ezra hears from Max that Max and Sally are holding his parents hostage and he must return to the U.S. fast. Patrick discovers a clue and takes personal time off to track Maddie down. He recruits his old retired boss to help.
14	4	"Andiamo"	April Mullen	Kathy Greenberg & Emily Cook	April 26, 2018	204	0.349
The Bumblers' plan to get over the border via coyote is complicated by the arrival of Jules' overbearing sister Poppy. Richard soon realizes that Maddie based her act of "Alice" completely on Poppy, which just makes him attracted to her. Patrick's former boss is worried he still feels for Maddie, who is now on the run again.
15	5	"Maybe/Definitely"	Sheree Folkson	Dean Imperial	May 3, 2018	205	0.453
A flashback shows how Max and Sally recruited the young Maddie. Richard learns that his house was foreclosed on and the Toby Jug with the ring is missing. Patrick and Cooke nearly check into the same hotel where Sally and Max are holding Ezra's father. They leave when they hear from Maddie's mother that Maddie is back at home. Ezra's father has a heart attack and dies during a fight with his captors. Maddie receives in the mail a mysterious cell phone delivering texts promising aid. The Bumblers hide out at the Langmore family cabin in upstate New York.
16	6	"That's Enough. Off You Go."	Sheree Folkson	Elisa Lomnitz Climent	May 10, 2018	206	0.407
Richard and Poppy sleep together but Richard is upset when Poppy sends sexy photos of him to her husband. She then leaves to meet up with her husband in Europe. Jules ends up at a bar with unrecognized Lenny and confesses her dark secret: she had stolen the work of her late roommate/lover for her college thesis, an event that her rich family covered up when she was caught. Ezra and his brother deal with their father's death. Cooke realizes Patrick is out to get Maddie back and quits their pursuit of the doctor. Maddie seeks help from the Doctor's former partner. Ezra is now forced to work for the Doctor.
17	7	"Maid Marian on Her Tip-Toed Feet"	Nick Gomez	Jeremy Boxen	May 17, 2018	207	0.444
Lenny compels the Bumblers to do a job for the Doctor: retrieve the ring from a collector in Vermont who bought Richard's Toby Jug. Sally lures Maddie to the cabin, and enlists everyone in her plan to destroy the Doctor and gain their freedom. They flee as Patrick and the FBI raid the cabin.
18	8	"Phase Two Sucks"	Nick Gomez	Andy Parker	May 24, 2018	TBA	0.469
Ezra attempts to charm Charlotte, the Toby Jug collector, to gain access to the jug with the hope that the ring is still inside. Maddie, Max and Sally try to determine the Doctor's identity and track him down. Sophia appears at Charlotte's door.
19	9	"The World Needs Heroes. Over."	Tobias Datum	Story by : Kathy Greenberg & Emily Cook; Teleplay by : Dean Imperial	May 31, 2018	TBA	0.412
Sophia's journey to Vermont to pose as Charlotte's home organizer is explained. Ezra secures the ring, and Sophia joins the operation to take down the Doctor. The group lures the Doctor to a medical conference with Patrick's help, but Sally appears to be secretly still allied with the Doctor. Maddie has her own plan: to kill the Doctor.
20	10	"See You Soon, Macaroon"	Adam Brooks	Adam Brooks & Paul Adelstein	June 7, 2018	TBA	0.487
Max, Sally, and the Bumblers execute their plan to trap the Doctor, and Sophia thwarts Maddie's attempt to kill him. Sally pretends to kill Max for the Doctor's benefit. Shelly appears at the hotel, but Jules stops him from killing Maddie. Sally changes the plan and kills the Doctor. Max collects all of the Doctor's assets, which he splits with the group. Patrick arrests Maddie, and the Bumblers say goodbye to each other, promising to meet back at the coffee shop below Jules' apartment in Brooklyn in 6 months. Ezra starts to throw the doctor's burner phones into Niagara Falls, but is interrupted by a child asking if he is "Mr. Puppy Dog Eyes." The child hands Ezra a note from Sophia and Ezra meets up with her at a motel. He throws Sophia's share of the money to her on the bed and asks if that's what she wanted. She says, "Yes, and something else, too. Come here. I'll tell you all about it." As Ezra approaches the bed, one of the burner phones rings; he answers it. "Hello, Doctor? It's Ernie," the voice says. "I have an update on Cincinnati." Ezra hesitates, and then with a mischievous expression says, "Go ahead, Ernie. I'm listening."

== Production and filming ==
The first season was filmed in Vancouver, British Columbia, Canada. Season 2 was filmed in Toronto, Niagara Falls and Mexico.

== Reception ==
=== Critical response ===
The show has received largely positive reviews. On the site Metacritic, it received a score of 70, indicating "generally favorable reviews". On Rotten Tomatoes, the show is rated 92% fresh, with the site's consensus reading, "Imposters meshes slapstick comedy, top-notch writing, unexpected twists, and a noteworthy lead performance, with satisfying – and surprisingly ambitious – results".

=== Ratings ===
==== Season 1 ====
Viewership and ratings per episode of Imposters
No.	Title	Air date	Rating (18–49)	Viewers (millions)
1	"My So-Called Wife"	February 7, 2017	0.21	0.655
2	"My Balls, Dickhead"	February 14, 2017	0.22	0.661
3	"We Wanted Every Lie"	February 21, 2017	0.22	0.627
4	"Cohen. Lenny Cohen"	February 28, 2017	0.27	0.745
5	"Is a Shark Good or Bad?"	March 7, 2017	0.23	0.701
6	"The Maddie Code"	March 14, 2017	0.31	0.872
7	"Frog-Bikini-Eiffel Tower"	March 21, 2017	0.29	0.804
8	"In the Game"	March 28, 2017	0.22	0.637
9	"Ladies and Gentlemen, the Doctor Is In"	April 4, 2017	0.29	0.805
10	"Always Forward, Never Back"	April 11, 2017	0.28	0.801

==== Season 2 ====
Viewership and ratings per episode of Imposters
No.	Title	Air date	Rating (18–49)	Viewers (millions)
1	"Fillion Bollar King"	April 5, 2018	0.14	0.441
2	"Trouble Maybe"	April 12, 2018	0.12	0.394
3	"Old Unresolved Sh*t"	April 19, 2018	0.12	0.397
4	"Andiamo"	April 26, 2018	0.11	0.349
5	"Maybe/Definitely"	May 3, 2018	0.13	0.453
6	"That's Enough. Off You Go."	May 10, 2018	0.12	0.407
7	"Maid Marian on Her Tip-Toed Feet"	May 17, 2018	0.12	0.444
8	"Phase Two Sucks"	May 24, 2018	0.14	0.469
9	"The World Needs Heroes."	May 31, 2018	0.11	0.412
10	"See You Soon, Macaroon"	June 7, 2018	0.13	0.487

=== Accolades ===
At the 2019 Women's Image Network Awards, the series was nominated for Drama Series, and Inbar Lavi won Actress Drama Series.
