= Charles Manson discography =

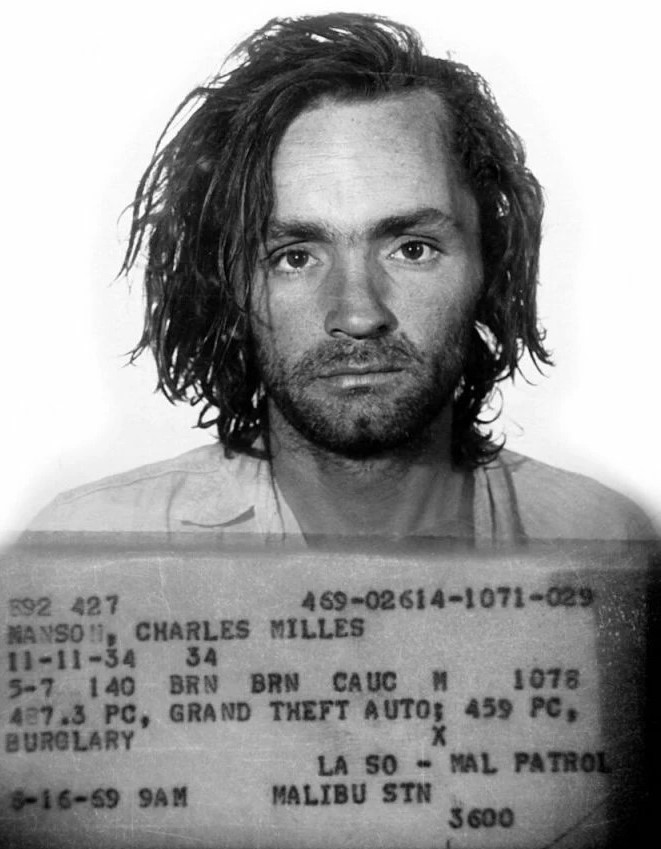
Manson's County Sheriff mugshot on August 16, 1969

Several recordings by Charles Manson and members of his "Family" have been released since Manson was indicted in late 1969 for the Tate–LaBianca murders.

== Sessions with the Beach Boys ==
In the summer of 1968, Manson recorded several tracks at Brian Wilson's home studio, but the recordings remain unheard to the public. The Beach Boys recorded one of Manson's songs, "Cease to Exist" (retitled "Never Learn Not to Love"), and released it as the B-side of their single "Bluebirds over the Mountain" in December 1968. Manson himself did not contribute to the recording.

== Lie: The Love and Terror Cult ==
In 1968, Phil Kaufman, who had met Manson in prison, moved in briefly with Manson and his "Family". Kaufman continually urged Manson to record some of his songs.

While Manson was being held on the Tate–LaBianca charges, he told Kaufman "please put out my music." According to Kaufman, Manson phoned him five days a week, even though he was allowed only three phone calls per day. Manson was "very anxious for his music to be heard."

After established record companies declined to become involved, Kaufman raised $3,000 and pressed 2,000 copies of the album Lie: The Love and Terror Cult. Consisting of recordings made from 1967 to 1969, the album contained thirteen songs. These included "Cease to Exist", a song the Beach Boys had recorded in modified form as "Never Learn Not to Love". Each of the original 2,000 copies came with a poster that was put out by "A Joint Venture" and that bore signatures of many prisoners and inmates, all supporting Manson and the Family.

The album was released March 6, 1970. It was distributed on the West Coast, by the same people who did the first underground album, Great White Wonder, a collection of pirated Bob Dylan tapes. Over the next couple of months, only about three hundred copies were sold. Having supposedly failed to recover his investment, Kaufman signed an agreement with New-York-based ESP-Disk to distribute the album nationally.

== Other recordings ==
The Manson family recorded songs written by Manson in 1970: first released on limited edition vinyl as The Manson Family Sings the Songs of Charles Manson in 1986, the recordings were reissued as The Family Jams in 1997; Manson himself does not perform.

In the 1980s, Manson made many recordings via tape recorders in prison. These were given to associates on the outside. It is not known exactly how many were made, however, over a dozen unique tapes have surfaced. These recordings were the source for several CDs such as Commemoration, Live at San Quentin and The Way of the Wolf. A short piece of spoken words by him also appears on a Greek private CD release by Anger Department. The acoustic album Completion was recorded in the 1980s by Henry Rollins of Black Flag fame. The record was supposed to be released by SST Records, but the project was later canceled due to the label receiving death threats. Only five test pressings of Completion were made, two of which remain in Rollins' possession.

Scheduled for release by Lupo Records on May 7, 2007, was the Charles Manson album The Summer of Hate – the '67 Sessions. It was the first release of the complete recordings that were made in a rehearsal studio on September 11, 1967, that went on to be used as demos in an effort to secure a recording deal.

Former Manson family member Bobby Beausoleil, who appeared as lead guitarist on several tracks from the Lie album, has released several recordings since being in prison. Beausoleil assembled inmates at Tracy Prison to form the Freedom Orchestra, including former Manson family member Steve "Clem" Grogan. Since being paroled in 1985, Grogan has been a member of several bands.

The limited edition compilation The Wit and Wisdom of Charles Manson contains spoken word, interviews, and unreleased music.

== Discography ==
=== Albums ===
- Lie: The Love and Terror Cult (LP, Performance, 1970. Reissued on LP/CD/MC on various labels). Recorded September 11, 1967, with overdubs added in 1968.
- White Rasta (MC). Songs and improvisations recorded in jail in 1983.
- Poor Old Prisoner Boy: The 55th Anniversary Album (LP, Remote Control Records, 1989). Contains 55 minutes of jail recordings. Edition of 555 copies, the 55th Anniversary Album.
- Son of Man (LP, 1992). The A side contains jail recordings, while the B side is etched with a reproduction of a drawing of faces done by Manson. Also includes liner notes of poetry attributed to Manson.
- Live at San Quentin (CD, Grey Matter, 1993). Contains the same tracks as White Rasta, in a different order.
- Charles Manson (CD, Grey Matter, 1993). A combination of Lie and The Manson Family Sings, packaged to look like The Beatles' self-titled album.
- Commemoration (CD, White Devil Records, 1994). Released to commemorate Manson's 60th birthday and "sixty years of struggle against cowardice, stupidity and lies", recorded in the early 1980s.
- Manson Speaks (2CD, White Devil Records, 1995). Contains recitals of poetry and Manson's opinions of current events.
- The Way of the Wolf (CD, Pale Horse, 1998). Music and some bonus conversation recorded in jail in the 1980s. This was a limited edition release of 1000 copies.
- Unplugged 9.11.67 Volume 1 (CD, Archer C.A.T. Productions Inc.). Recordings done by Manson on September 11, 1967, as well as spoken words between Manson and some people at the recording session.
- A Taste of Freedom (CD-R, 2001). Contains telephone conversations with Charles Manson recorded in late 1999 and early 2000. Very limited edition.
- All the Way Alive (CD, FamilyJams.com). Thirteen previously unreleased studio recordings from 11 September 1967. (Formerly People's Temple Records, 2003, Edition of 1000 copies).
- One Mind (CD, FamilyJams.com, 2005). Sixteen new recordings of songs, guitar, impromptu poetry and words.
- Charles Manson Sings (CD, ESP Disk, 2006). Digitally remastered combination of Lie and 12 of the 13 tracks on All the Way Alive.
- The Summer of Hate – The '67 Sessions (CD, Lupo Records, May 7, 2007). 18 additional tracks to Lie, also recorded 11 September 1967.
- The Wit and Wisdom of Charles Manson (CD, no label, 2008). 2 cd-rs full of interviews, spoken word and remixed music.
- Air (CD/LP/Digital Download, Magic Bullet Records, 2010). Brand new unheard music. This album is the first of a four-part seasonal series which will spell out Charles Manson's life support acronym ATWA.
- ATWAR (Cassette Tape, White Devil Records, 2010). 25 minutes filled with new music and new spoken word recorded by Manson in September 1984.
- Trees (CD/LP/Digital Download, Magic Bullet Records, 2011). The second part of a four-part seasonal series which will spell out Charles Manson's life support acronym ATWA.
- The Lost Vacaville Tapes (LP, Underworld Productions, Inc, 2013). Lost tapes recorded through 1983–1984 at the California Medical Facility and released on vinyl available for a limited time. Recordings made by Manson at Vacaville during 1983-4 were released on a vinyl LP by Ben Gurecki in 2013.

=== Singles ===
- "Garbage Dump" / "People Say I'm No Good" (7" picture disc, Spahn Ranch Records 001 PIC.)
- "I'm on Fire" / "The Hallways of Always" - Tracks taken from Commemoration
- "Look at Your Game, Girl" / "Your Home Is Where You're Happy"
- "Inner Sanctum" (7", Holy Terror Records, 2010). 14 minutes of recent music and insight
- "Horsefly" (7", The Zou, Parasitic Records, November 11, 2011). Sixteen minutes and sixteen seconds of new and previously unreleased music. This record commemorates "the anniversary of Charles Manson's 77th year of resistance."

=== The Family without Manson ===
- The Manson Family Sings the Songs of Charles Manson (LP). 1970 recordings of Manson's songs performed by Steve Grogan as lead singer, along with Red, Blue, Gypsy, Brenda, Ouisch and Capistrano.
- The Family Jams (2CD, Transparency 0011). The first disc (The Family Jams) contains all the music on The Manson Family Sings the Songs of Charles Manson, while the second disc (Family Jams Too) features previously unreleased recordings also dating from 1970.
- In early 1970, The Manson Family got everyone together in the Spahn Ranch Saloon late at night to record the Family Jams for Robert Hendrickson's MANSON film. Even Bruce Davis, then hunted by the FBI, was there. Some of the songs were so new, most of the Family members did not know all of the lyrics yet. The Jam session lasted for hours, and the audio tapes remain buried in a vault.

== See also ==
- List of covers of Charles Manson songs
