= Look at Your Game, Girl =

1970 song by Charles Manson

Song by Charles Manson

from the album Lie: The Love and Terror Cult
- Released: 1970
- Recorded: 1968
- Genre: Folk rock; psychedelic folk
- Length: 2:00
- Label: ESP-Disk
- Songwriter: Charles Manson
- Producer: Phil Kaufman

"Look at Your Game, Girl" is a song written by Charles Manson from his album Lie: The Love and Terror Cult (1970). A folk rock and psychedelic folk ballad about a confused young woman, the song was included on a tape that Manson sent to record companies. His version of the song received mostly positive reviews from critics, who felt that the track had musical merit and drew connections between its lyrics and the ways in which Manson manipulated his followers.

After Axl Rose was introduced to Lie: The Love and Terror Cult, Guns N' Roses released a cover of "Look at Your Game, Girl" on their album "The Spaghetti Incident?" (1993). The Guns N' Roses version of the song is a lounge music ballad with acoustic guitar and congas in its instrumentation that features elements of Brazilian and Caribbean music. The band's cover of the track was negatively reviewed by critics, who felt it was in poor taste. Guns N' Roses' decision to cover the song sparked considerable controversy, as some worried that Manson could profit off the song. Ultimately, Manson's royalties from the cover were assigned to Bartek Frykowski, the son of Manson victim Voytek Frykowski, and the controversy did not hurt sales of "The Spaghetti Incident?".

== Background and composition ==
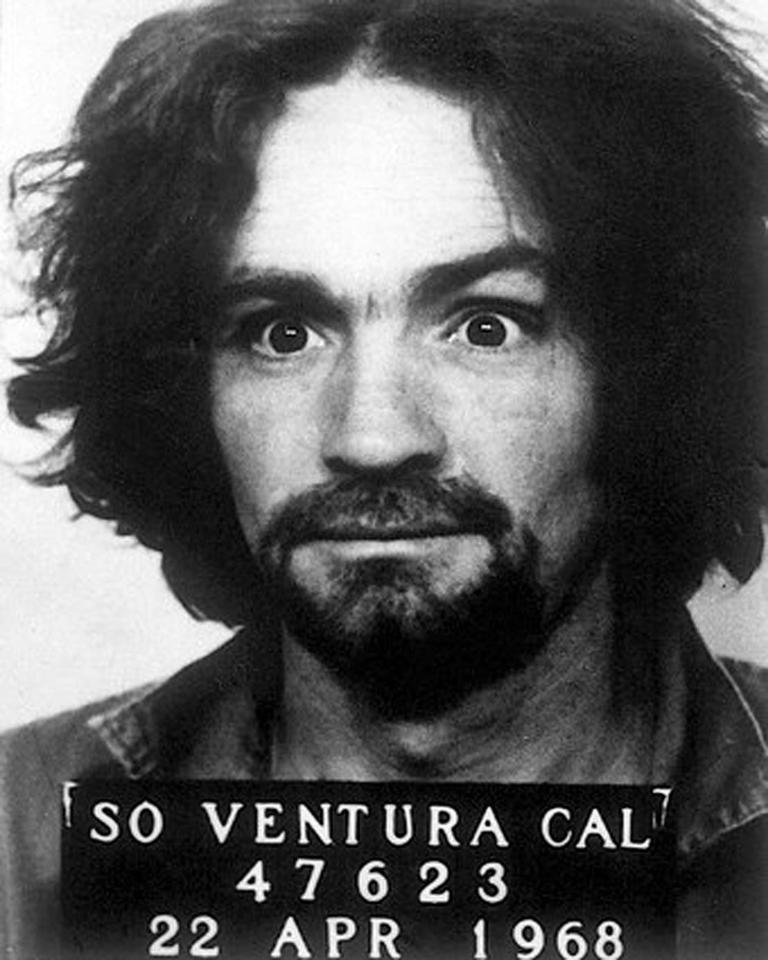
Mugshot of Manson taken in early 1968

"Look at Your Game, Girl" was written in 1968 in the hopes that it would help Manson to get a record contract. The song is a folk rock and psychedelic folk song with a length of two minutes. It is a mid-tempo ballad, and, like all of the songs on Lie: The Love and Terror Cult, a demo. Manson sings: "Think you're loving baby, but all you're doing is crying... Are those feelings real?"; the track is about an insane woman who is playing a "mad game" and, in searching for love, has only found sadness.

According to Alex Henderson of AllMusic, "Look at Your Game, Girl" "embodies Manson's fundamental approach to influencing young women by targeting their socially imposed hang-ups and implying that his way is better and more liberating. This is problematic considering his remarkable knack for mind control." Manson generally took influence from figures such as The Beatles, Robert A. Heinlein, and L. Ron Hubbard. Discussing Manson's music, Mark Savage of BBC News deemed his guitar playing "basic" and his lyrics "disorganized".

Manson recorded a still-unreleased runthrough of "Look at Your Game, Girl" on the same eight-track tape that The Beach Boys used for the 20/20 outtake "Well You Know I Knew". A different recording of the song was included on a tape that Manson sent to record companies, after he was jailed for committing the Tate murders in 1969, that tape was commercially released as Lie in 1970 by Manson's former roommate Phil Kaufman, and copyrighted by Awareness Records.

== Critical reception ==
Alexis Petridis of The Guardian wrote that "If you could make a vague and far from watertight claim for a couple of the songs Manson recorded prior to the murders having some musical value – not least Look at Your Game, Girl – there is absolutely nothing worth hearing in [Manson's] subsequent recordings." All About Jazz's Raul D'Gama Rose deemed "Look at Your Game, Girl" an "iconic" song which has "stood up to the test of time." Chris Yates of Noisey said that "The song is a semi-interesting folk rock anomaly, although obviously one that would have disappeared into oblivion if not for its author." Yates found it superior to the music made by cult leaders David Koresh and Jim Jones. Writing for GQ, Jeff Vrabel called the track a "Manson-penned banger" while TeamRock's Howard Johnson viewed the song as "surprisingly tender". Mark Savage of BBC News said that Manson's music is "not very good" but that the lyrics of "Look at Your Game, Girl" "[paint] an eerily accurate picture of the methods he used to manipulate the members of his cult." Eduardo Rivadavia of Ultimate Classic Rock viewed the song as a "psychedelic relic".

== Guns N' Roses version ==
=== Background and composition ===
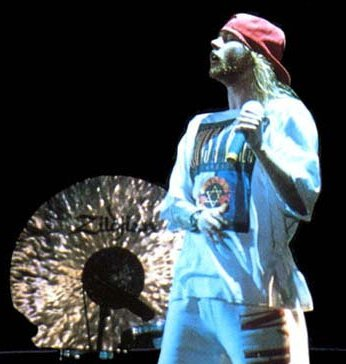
Rose at Yarkon Park in Tel Aviv, Israel, in May 1993

There are conflicting accounts of how Axl Rose was first exposed to "Look at Your Game, Girl". Rose himself claimed that he was introduced to the track by his brother during a game of musical trivia. Marilyn Manson discussed meeting Rose in his autobiography, The Long Hard Road Out of Hell (1998). According to the autobiography, Trent Reznor of Nine Inch Nails took Manson to a U2 concert where he met Rose backstage; there, Manson mentioned his song "My Monkey", which incorporates lyrics from Lie: The Love and Terror Cult. Rose commented that he had never heard of Lie, and Manson encouraged him to listen to it. Six months later, Rose's band Guns N' Roses released a cover of "Look at Your Game, Girl" on "The Spaghetti Incident?" (1993), a cover album of punk rock songs. Marilyn Manson later expressed anger that it had become "trendy" for musicians to reference Charles Manson in their music. Around the same time that Guns N' Roses covered "Look at Your Game, Girl", Rose wore a shirt depicting Charles Manson alongside the words "Charlie don't surf".

Rose said that upon hearing "Look at Your Game, Girl" "I liked the lyrics and the melody. Hearing it shocked me, and I thought there might be other people who would like to hear it." Rose also "felt that it was ironic that such a song [about insanity] was recorded by Charles Manson, someone who should know the inner intricacies of madness." The song was released upon Rose's demand, despite protest from his bandmates. Rose along with Dizzy Reed (on percussion) are the only members of Guns N' Roses to perform on the track, with the acoustic guitar played by Carlos Booy. Guns N' Roses' cover is a lounge music ballad with elements of Brazilian music and Caribbean music, as well as congas in its instrumentation. Geoffrey Himes of Paste deemed the song "breezy" while Bryan Rolli of Billboard called it "sprightly".

Rose's vocals on the track are nasal. According to Himes of Paste, Guns N' Roses' version does not substantially alter Charles Manson's original. The cover ends with Rose saying "Thanks, Chas". The song was released as a hidden track on the album and Manson is never mentioned on the album's packaging. On the album, "Look at Your Game, Girl" begins after twelve seconds of silence following the preceding track, "I Don't Care About You". The band's publicist Bryn Bridenthal claimed that the band's decision to cover a Manson track was not meant to be a publicity stunt, while Slash said the cover was done in a spirit of "naive and innocent black humour". Nick Kent of The Guardian reported that the track was intended as a message to Rose's ex-girlfriend Stephanie Seymour.

=== Critical reception and controversy ===
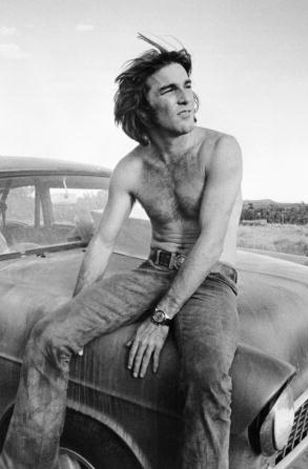
Axl Rose claimed he initially believed that Dennis Wilson was the song's composer.

Rolling Stone's Elisabeth Garber-Paul wrote that the "straightforward cover" is "a rather unimpressive track on first listen", adding that it sounds like "a half-assed attempt at seducing a woman...until you realize that the guy who wrote it led a female-heavy cult." In his review of "The Spaghetti Incident?", Stephen Thomas Erlewine of AllMusic said that "the tacked-on Charles Manson song leaves a bad aftertaste, but not because of the song itself; the inclusion of the song seems like a publicity-seeking stunt, a way to increase their sales while trying to regain their street credibility. And as The Spaghetti Incident? proves, they didn't need to stoop so low."

Alexis Petridis of The Guardian wrote that Guns N' Roses' cover and other references to Manson by musicians are "an exercise in button-pushing, an increasingly hackneyed, cliched shortcut to suggest the artist involved is dangerous and unbiddable, an outlaw who defies conventional mores" and "frequently seem to be done without any real thought as to what exactly the artist is aligning themselves with". Eduardo Rivadavia of Ultimate Classic Rock deemed the cover the single worst song of the band's career, dismissing it as "a forced attempt to underscore their 'most dangerous band in the world' reputation." Conversely, the staff of Spin called the song "Legitimately Kind of Good" and superior to "Paradise City" (1987), though they were sickened by the track's origins.

According to Christopher R. Weingarten of Rolling Stone, "Covering a notorious murder-conspirator would be one of the last big controversies in the band's original run." J. D. Considine wrote in The Baltimore Sun that "the album had barely been in record stores a week before law-enforcement and victims-rights groups began expressing outrage." Patti Tate, daughter of Doris Tate and sister of Sharon Tate, responded to the cover by saying "Doesn't Axl Rose realize what this man did to my family? It really hurts and angers me that Guns N' Roses would exploit the murders of my sister and others for capital gain." Jesse McKinley of The New York Times reported that Manson could earn up to $60,000 for every million copies of "The Spaghetti Incident?" that were sold, while the California Department of Corrections and Rehabilitation said the figure was $62,000 for every million copies of the album sold. David Geffen, the head of Geffen Records, the label which released "The Spaghetti Incident?", commented: "The fact that Charles Manson would be earning money from the fame he derived committing one of the most horrific crimes of the 20th century is unthinkable to me"; Geffen had been acquainted with two of the Manson Family's victims.

To counter claims that he was glorifying Manson, Rose said that "I'm by no means a Manson expert or anything, but the things he's done are something I don't believe in. He's a sick individual." Rose also claimed that he initially believed that Dennis Wilson, a Beach Boy and former acquaintance of Manson's, authored the song. McKinley of The New York Times found Roses' claim dubious, as Rose thanks "Chas" on the cover. The band considered removing the track from subsequent copies of "The Spaghetti Incident?". Manson's share of the royalties was assigned to Bartek Frykowski, the son of Manson victim Voytek Frykowski. Bartek Frykowski, whose children were fans of the band, commented that "Even though this new situation cannot change the past, my hope is that something positive will emerge for the future." He viewed the band's decision to cover a Manson track and the fallout from it as "a bizarre chain of events". J. D. Considine of The Baltimore Sun noted that the controversy did not hinder the sales of "The Spaghetti Incident?". The controversy led representatives of Nothing Records to tell Marilyn Manson that the label would not release "My Monkey", though they later changed their minds and released the song.

== See also ==
- "Never Learn Not to Love"
