= Live at San Quentin =

Live at San Quentin may refer to:

- Live at San Quentin (B.B. King album), 1990
- Live at San Quentin (Charles Manson album), 1993

== See also ==
- At San Quentin, the 1969 album by Johnny Cash
