= One mind =

One mind may refer to:

- A doctrine in East Asian Buddhism which can be traced to the Awakening of Faith in the Mahāyāna
- A concept in New Thought
- One Mind, Charles Manson album
