= Charles Manson =

American murderer and cult leader (1934–2017)

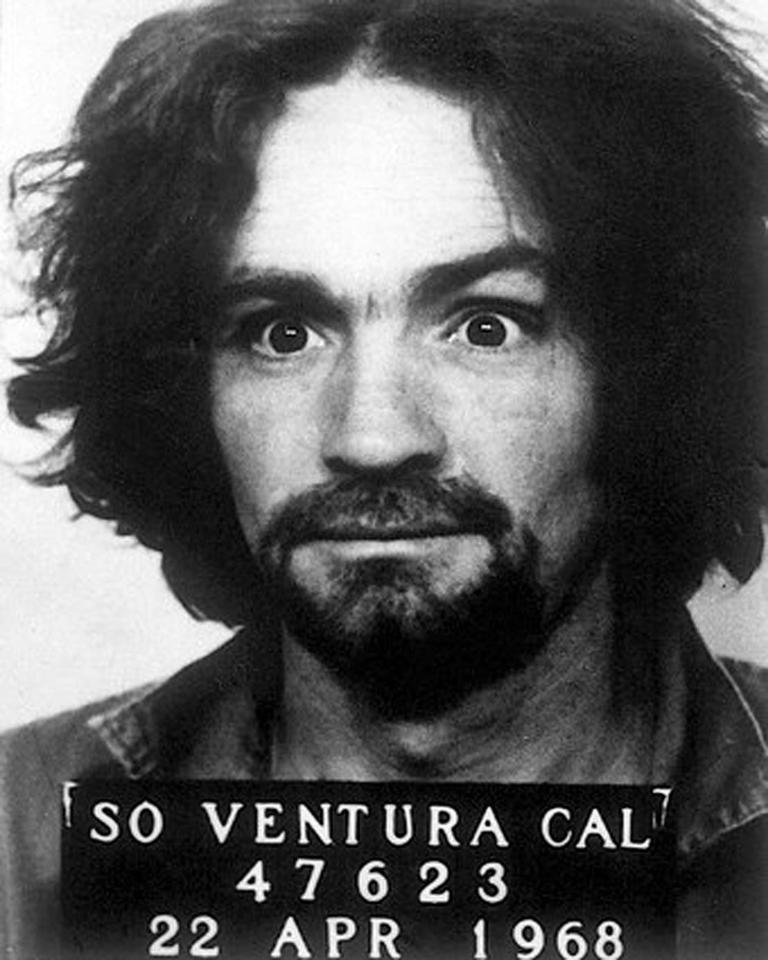
- Mug shot of Manson, 1968
- Born: Charles Milles Maddox; November 12, 1934; Cincinnati, Ohio, US
- Died: November 19, 2017 (aged 83); Bakersfield, California, US
- Known for: Leader of the Manson Family cult and orchestrating the Tate–LaBianca murders
- Criminal information
- Motive: "Helter Skelter," narcissism, psychopathy and psychological manipulation
- Criminal charges: First-degree murder (7 counts); Conspiracy to murder
- Penalty: Death; commuted to life imprisonment
- Accomplice: Members of the Manson Family

Details
- Victims: 10 murdered (by proxy; including an unborn baby); 1 attempted murder (directly); 1 raped (1952)
- Span of crimes: Sometime in the 1940s – 1969

Charles Milles Manson (né Maddox; November 12, 1934 – November 19, 2017) was an American criminal and musician who was the central figure and leader of the Manson Family. He orchestrated the Tate–LaBianca murders, in which his followers murdered eight people around Los Angeles, including actress Sharon Tate and her unborn child. The murders triggered a wave of fear across the United States and effectively ended the idealism that was associated with the counterculture of the 1960s.

Before the murders, Manson had spent more than half of his life in correctional institutions. While gathering his cult followers, he was a singer-songwriter on the fringe of the Los Angeles music industry, chiefly through an association with Dennis Wilson of the Beach Boys, who introduced Manson to record producer Terry Melcher. In 1968, the Beach Boys recorded Manson's song "Cease to Exist", renamed "Never Learn Not to Love" as a single B-side, but Manson was uncredited. Afterward, he attempted to secure a record contract through Melcher, but was unsuccessful.

Manson would often talk about the Beatles, including their eponymous 1968 album. According to Los Angeles County District Attorney Vincent Bugliosi, Manson felt guided by his interpretation of the Beatles' lyrics and adopted the term "Helter Skelter" to describe an impending apocalyptic race war. During his trial, Bugliosi argued that Manson had intended to start a race war, although Manson and others disputed this. Contemporary interviews and trial witness testimony insisted that the Tate–LaBianca murders were copycat crimes intended to exonerate Manson's friend Bobby Beausoleil. Manson denied having ordered any murders. He spent the rest of his life in prison and died from complications from colon cancer in 2017.

== 1934–1967: Early life ==
=== Childhood ===
Charles Milles Maddox was born on November 12, 1934, to 16-year-old Ada Kathleen Maddox of Ashland, Kentucky, in Cincinnati General Hospital, now the University of Cincinnati Academic Health Center, in Cincinnati, Ohio. Manson's Ohio birth certificate simply lists his name as "Manson." In August 1934, before Manson's birth, Maddox married William Eugene Manson (1909–1961), a laborer at a dry cleaning business. Maddox often went on drinking sprees with her brother Luther Elbert Maddox (1916–1950), leaving Charles with babysitters. On April 30, 1937, Maddox and her husband divorced, after William alleged "gross neglect of duty" by Maddox. Charles retained William's last name of Manson. On August 1, 1939, Kathleen and Luther were arrested for assault and robbery, and sentenced to five and ten years of imprisonment, respectively.

His biological father appears to have been Colonel Walker Henderson Scott Sr. of Catlettsburg, Kentucky, against whom Maddox filed a paternity suit that resulted in an agreed judgment in 1937. Scott worked intermittently in local mills and had a local reputation as a con artist. He allowed Maddox to believe that he was an army colonel, although "Colonel" was merely his given name. When Maddox told Scott that she was pregnant, he informed her that he had been called away on army business. After several months, she realized he had no intention of returning. Manson never knew his biological father.

Manson was placed in the home of an aunt and uncle in McMechen, West Virginia. His mother was paroled in 1942. Manson later characterized the first weeks after she returned from prison as the happiest time in his life. Weeks after her release, Manson's family moved to Charleston, West Virginia, where he frequently played truant and his mother spent her evenings drinking. She was arrested for grand larceny, but not convicted. The family later moved to Indianapolis, where Maddox met alcoholic Lewis Woodson Cavender Jr. (1916–1979) through Alcoholics Anonymous meetings, and married him in August 1943.

=== First offenses ===
In an interview with Diane Sawyer, Manson stated that when he was aged 9, he set his school on fire. He also got repeatedly in trouble for truancy and petty theft. In 1947, although there was a lack of foster home placements, at age 13, Manson was placed in the Gibault School for Boys in Terre Haute, Indiana, a school for male delinquents run by Catholic priests. Gibault was a strict school, where punishment for even the smallest infraction included beatings with either a wooden paddle or a leather strap. Manson ran away from Gibault and slept in the woods, under bridges and wherever else he could find shelter.

Manson fled home to his mother and spent Christmas 1947 at his aunt and uncle's house in West Virginia. His mother returned him to Gibault. Ten months later, he ran away to Indianapolis. It was there, in 1948, that Manson committed his first documented crime by robbing a grocery store, at first to simply find something to eat. Manson found a cigar box containing just over a hundred dollars, which he used to rent a room on Indianapolis's skid row and to buy food.

For a time, Manson had a job delivering messages for Western Union in an attempt to live honestly. He quickly began to supplement his wages through theft. He was eventually caught, and in 1949 a sympathetic judge sent him to Boys Town, a juvenile facility in Omaha, Nebraska. After four days at Boys Town, he and fellow student Blackie Nielson obtained a gun and stole a car. They used it to commit two armed robberies on their way to the home of Nielson's uncle in Peoria, Illinois. Nielson's uncle was a professional thief, and when the boys arrived he allegedly took them on as apprentices. Manson was arrested two weeks later during a nighttime raid on a Peoria store. In the investigation that followed, he was linked to his two earlier armed robberies. He was sent to the Indiana Boys School, a strict reform school outside of Plainfield, Indiana.

At the Indiana Boys School, other students allegedly raped Manson with the encouragement of a staff member, and he was repeatedly beaten. He ran away from the school eighteen times. Manson developed a self-defense technique he later called the "insane game", in which he would screech, grimace and wave his arms to convince stronger aggressors that he was insane. In February 1951, after a number of failed attempts, he escaped with two other boys. The three escapees robbed filling stations while attempting to drive to California in stolen cars, until they were arrested in Utah. For the federal crime of driving a stolen car across state lines, Manson was sent to Washington, D.C.'s National Training School for Boys. On arrival, he was given aptitude tests which determined that he was illiterate, with an IQ of 109. His case worker deemed him aggressively antisocial.

=== First imprisonment ===
In October 1951, on a psychiatrist's recommendation, Manson was transferred to Natural Bridge Honor Camp, a minimum security institution in Virginia. His aunt visited him and told administrators she would let him stay at her house and help him find work. Manson had a parole hearing scheduled for February 1952. In January, he was caught raping a boy at knifepoint. Manson was transferred to the Federal Reformatory in Petersburg, Virginia, where he committed a further "eight serious disciplinary offenses, three involving homosexual acts". He was then moved to a maximum security reformatory at Chillicothe, Ohio, where he was expected to remain until his release on his 21st birthday in November 1955. Good behavior led to an early release in May 1954, to live with his aunt and uncle in West Virginia.

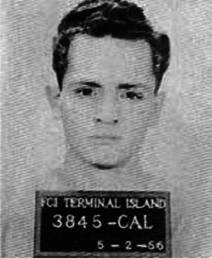
Manson, aged 21. Booking photo, Federal Correctional Institution, Terminal Island, May 2, 1956

In January 1955, Manson married a hospital waitress named Rosalie "Rosie" Jean Willis (January 28, 1939 – August 21, 2009). Around October, about three months after he and his pregnant wife arrived in Los Angeles in a car he had stolen in Ohio, Manson was again charged with a federal crime for taking the vehicle across state lines. After a psychiatric evaluation, he was given five years' probation. Manson's failure to appear at a Los Angeles hearing on an identical charge filed in Florida resulted in his March 1956 arrest in Indianapolis. His probation was revoked, and he was sentenced to three years' imprisonment at Terminal Island in Los Angeles.

While Manson was in prison, Rosalie gave birth to their son, Charles Manson Jr. (April 10, 1956 – June 29, 1993). During his first year at Terminal Island, Manson received visits from Rosalie and his mother, who were now living together in Los Angeles. In March 1957, when the visits from his wife ceased, his mother informed him Rosalie was living with another man. Less than two weeks before a scheduled parole hearing, Manson tried to escape by stealing a car. He was given five years' probation and his parole was denied.

=== Second imprisonment ===
In September 1958, Manson received five years' parole, the same year in which Rosalie received a decree of divorce. By November, he was pimping a 16-year-old girl and receiving additional support from a girl with wealthy parents. In September 1959, he pleaded guilty to a charge of attempting to cash a forged U.S. Treasury check, which he claimed to have stolen from a mailbox; the latter charge was later dropped. He received a ten-year suspended sentence and probation after a young woman named Leona Rae "Candy" Stevens, who had an arrest record for prostitution, made a "tearful plea" before the court that she and Manson were "deeply in love ... and would marry if Charlie were freed". Before the year's end, Stevens married Manson. Vincent Bugliosi, the prosecutor who later secured Manson's murder conviction, believed the marriage may have been so she could not be required to testify against Manson.

Manson took Leona and another woman to New Mexico for purposes of prostitution, resulting in him being held and questioned for violating the Mann Act. Though he was released, Manson correctly suspected that the investigation had not ended. When he disappeared in violation of his probation, a bench warrant was issued. In April 1960, an indictment for violation of the Mann Act followed. Following the arrest of one of the women for prostitution, Manson was arrested in June in Laredo, Texas, and was returned to Los Angeles. For violating his probation on the check-cashing charge, he was ordered to serve his ten-year sentence.

Manson spent a year trying unsuccessfully to appeal the revocation of his probation. In July 1961, he was transferred from the Los Angeles County Jail to the United States Penitentiary at McNeil Island, Washington. There, he took guitar lessons from Barker–Karpis gang leader Alvin "Creepy" Karpis, and obtained from another inmate the contact information of Phil Kaufman, a record producer and tour manager. Among Manson's fellow prisoners during this time was future actor Danny Trejo; the two participated in several hypnosis sessions together. Manson's mother moved to Washington State to be closer to him during his McNeil Island incarceration, working nearby as a waitress.

Although the Mann Act charge had been dropped, the attempt to cash the Treasury check was still a federal offense. Manson's September 1961 annual review noted he had a "tremendous drive to call attention to himself", an observation echoed in September 1964. In 1963, Leona was granted a divorce. During the process, she alleged that she and Manson had a son, Charles Luther Manson. According to a popular urban legend, Manson auditioned unsuccessfully for the Monkees in late 1965. This is refuted by the fact that Manson was still incarcerated at McNeil Island at the time.

In June 1966, Manson was sent for the second time to Terminal Island in preparation for early release. By the time of his release day on March 21, 1967, he had spent more than half of his thirty-two years in prisons and other institutions. This was mainly because he had broken federal laws. Federal sentences were, and remain, much more severe than state sentences for many of the same offenses. Telling the authorities that prison had become his home, he requested permission to stay.

== 1967–1968: San Francisco and cult formation ==
=== Parolee and patient ===
Less than a month after his 1967 release, Manson moved to Berkeley from Los Angeles, which could have been a probation violation. Instead, after calling the San Francisco probation office upon his arrival, he was transferred to the supervision of criminology doctoral researcher and federal probation officer Roger Smith. Until the spring of 1968, Smith worked at the Haight Ashbury Free Medical Clinic (HAFMC), which Manson and his family came to frequent. Roger Smith, as well as the HAFMC's founder David E. Smith, received funding from the National Institutes of Health, and reportedly the CIA, to study the effects of drugs like LSD and methamphetamine on the counterculture movement in San Francisco's Haight–Ashbury District. The patients at the HAFMC became subjects of their research, including Manson and his expanding group of mostly female followers, who came to see Roger Smith regularly.

Manson received permission from Roger Smith to move from Berkeley to the Haight-Ashbury District. He first took LSD and would use it frequently during his time there. David Smith, who had studied the effects of LSD and amphetamines in rodents, wrote that the change in Manson's personality during this time "was the most abrupt Roger Smith had observed in his entire professional career." Manson also read the book Stranger in a Strange Land, a science fiction novel by Robert Heinlein.

Inspired by the burgeoning free love philosophy in Haight–Ashbury during the Summer of Love, Manson began preaching his own philosophy based on a mixture of Stranger in a Strange Land, the Bible, Scientology, Dale Carnegie and the Beatles, which quickly earned him a following. He may have also borrowed some of his philosophy from the Process Church of the Final Judgement, whose members believed Satan would become reconciled to Jesus and they would come together at the end of the world to judge humanity.

=== Involvement with Scientology ===
Manson began studying Scientology while incarcerated with the help of fellow inmate Lanier Rayner, and in July 1961 listed Scientology as his religion. A September 1961 prison report argues that Manson "appears to have developed a certain amount of insight into his problems through his study of this discipline". Another prison report in August 1966 stated that Manson was no longer an advocate of Scientology. Upon his release in 1967, Manson traveled to Los Angeles where he reportedly "met local Scientologists and attended several parties for movie stars". Manson completed 150 hours of auditing. His "right hand man", Bruce Davis, worked at the Church of Scientology headquarters in London from November 1968 to April 1969.

=== San Francisco followers ===
Shortly after relocating to San Francisco, Manson became acquainted with Mary Brunner, a 23-year-old graduate of University of Wisconsin–Madison. Brunner was working as a library assistant at the University of California, Berkeley, and Manson, until that point making his living by panhandling, moved in with her. Manson then met teenaged runaway Lynette Fromme, later nicknamed "Squeaky", and convinced her to live with him and Brunner. According to a second-hand account, Manson overcame Brunner's initial resistance to him bringing other women in to live with them. Before long, they were sharing Brunner's residence with eighteen other women. Manson targeted individuals for manipulation who were emotionally insecure and social outcasts.

Manson established himself as a guru in Haight-Ashbury which, during the Summer of Love, was emerging as the signature hippie locale. Manson soon had the first of his groups of followers, most of them female. They were later dubbed as the "Manson Family" by Los Angeles prosecutor Vincent Bugliosi and the media. Manson allegedly taught his followers that they were the reincarnation of the original Christians, and that The Establishment could be characterized as the Romans.

Sometime around 1967, Manson began using the alias "Charles Willis Manson". Before the end of summer, he and some of his followers began traveling in an old school bus they had adapted, putting colored rugs and pillows in place of the many seats they had removed. They eventually settled in the Los Angeles areas of Topanga Canyon, Malibu and Venice along the coast.

In 1967, Brunner became pregnant by Manson. On April 15, 1968, she gave birth to their son, whom she named Valentine Michael, in a condemned house where they were living in Topanga Canyon. She was assisted by several of the young women from the fledgling Family. Brunner, like most members of the group, acquired a number of aliases and nicknames, including: "Marioche", "Och", "Mother Mary", "Mary Manson", "Linda Dee Manson" and "Christine Marie Euchts".

In his book Love Needs Care about his time at the HAFMC, David E. Smith claimed that Manson attempted to reprogram his followers' minds to "submit totally to his will" through the use of "LSD and ... unconventional sexual practices" that would turn his followers into "empty vessels that would accept anything he poured". Manson Family member Paul Watkins testified that Manson would encourage group LSD trips and take lower doses himself to "keep his wits about him". Watkins stated that "Charlie's trip was to program us all to submit." By the end of his stay in the Haight in April 1968, Manson had attracted twenty or so followers, all under the supervision of Roger Smith and many of the staff at the HAFMC. The core members of Manson's following eventually included: Brunner; Charles "Tex" Watson, a musician and former actor; Bobby Beausoleil, a former musician and actor; Susan Atkins; Patricia Krenwinkel; and Leslie Van Houten.

=== Subsequent arrests ===
Supervised by his ostensible parole officer Roger Smith, Manson grew his family through drug use and prostitution without interference from the authorities. Manson was arrested on July 31, 1967, for attempting to prevent the arrest of one of his followers, Ruth Ann Moorehouse. Instead of Manson being sent back to prison, the charge was reduced to a misdemeanor and Manson was given three additional years of probation. He avoided prosecution again in July 1968, when he and the family were arrested while moving to Los Angeles, after his bus crashed into a ditch. Manson and members of his family, including Brunner and Manson's newborn baby, were found sleeping naked by police. Afterwards, he was again arrested and released only a few days later, this time on a drug charge.

=== Involvement with the Beach Boys ===
On April 6, 1968, Dennis Wilson of the Beach Boys was driving through Malibu when he noticed two female hitchhikers, Krenwinkel and Ella Jo Bailey. He picked them up and dropped them off at their destination. On April 11, Wilson noticed the same two girls hitchhiking again and this time took them to his home at 14400 Sunset Boulevard. Wilson later recalled that he "told [the girls] about our involvement with the Maharishi and they told me they too had a guru, a guy named Charlie [Manson] who'd recently come out of jail after twelve years."

Wilson then went to a recording session. When he returned later that night, he was met in his driveway by Manson, and when Wilson walked into his home, about a dozen people were occupying the premises, most of them young women. By Manson's own account, he had met Wilson on at least one prior occasion: at a friend's San Francisco house where Manson had gone to obtain marijuana. Manson claimed that Wilson invited him to visit his home when Manson came to Los Angeles.

Wilson was initially fascinated by Manson and his followers, referring to him as "the Wizard" in a Rave magazine article at the time. The two struck a friendship, and over the next few months members of the Manson Family – mostly women who were treated as servants – were housed in Wilson's residence. This arrangement persisted for about six months.

Wilson introduced Manson to a few friends in the music business, including the Byrds' producer Terry Melcher. Manson recorded numerous songs at Brian Wilson's home studio, although the recordings remain unheard by the public. Band engineer Stephen Desper said that the Manson sessions were done "for Dennis [Wilson] and Terry Melcher". In September 1968, Wilson recorded a Manson song for the Beach Boys, originally titled "Cease to Exist", but reworked as "Never Learn Not to Love", as a single B-side released the following December. The writing was credited solely to Wilson. When asked why Manson was not credited, Wilson explained that Manson relinquished his publishing rights in favor of "about a hundred thousand dollars' worth of stuff". Around this time, the Family destroyed two of Wilson's luxury cars.

Wilson eventually distanced himself from Manson and moved out of the Sunset Boulevard house, leaving the Family there, and took residence at a basement apartment in Santa Monica. Virtually all of Wilson's household possessions were stolen by the Family. The members were evicted from his home three weeks before the lease was scheduled to expire. When Manson sought further contact, he left a bullet with Wilson's housekeeper to be delivered with a threatening message.

Band manager Nick Grillo recalled that Wilson became concerned after Manson had got "into a much heavier drug situation ... taking a tremendous amount of acid and Dennis wouldn't tolerate it and asked him to leave. It was difficult for Dennis because he was afraid of Charlie." Writing in his 2016 memoir, Mike Love recalled Wilson saying he had witnessed Manson shooting a black man "in half" with an M16 rifle and hiding the body inside a well. Melcher said that Wilson had been aware that the Family "were killing people" and had been "so freaked out he just didn't want to live anymore. He was afraid, and he thought he should have gone to the authorities, but he didn't, and the rest of it happened."

=== Spahn Ranch ===
Manson established a base for the Family at the Spahn Ranch in August 1968, after their eviction from Wilson's residence. The ranch had been a television and movie set for Westerns, but the buildings had deteriorated by the late-1960s. The ranch then derived revenue primarily from selling horseback rides. Female Family members did chores around the ranch and, occasionally, had sex on Manson's orders with the nearly blind 80-year-old owner, George Spahn. The women also acted as guides for him. In exchange, Spahn allowed Manson and his group to live at the ranch for free.

=== Doomsday beliefs ===
The Manson Family evolved into a doomsday cult when Manson became fixated on the idea of an imminent apocalyptic race war between America's Black minority and the larger White population. A white supremacist, Manson told some of the Family that Black people would rise up and kill the entire White population except for Manson and his followers, but they were not intelligent enough to survive on their own. They needed a white man to lead them, and so they would serve Manson as their "master". In late-1968, Manson adopted the term "Helter Skelter", taken from a song on the Beatles' recently released White Album, to refer to this upcoming war.

=== Tate encounter ===
On March 23, 1969, Manson entered the grounds of 10050 Cielo Drive, which he had known as Melcher's residence. He was not invited. As he approached the main house, Manson was met by Shahrokh Hatami, an Iranian photographer who had befriended film director Roman Polanski and his wife Sharon Tate during the making of the documentary Mia and Roman. Hatami was there to photograph Tate before she departed for Rome the following day. Seeing Manson approach, Hatami went onto the front porch to ask him what he wanted.

Manson said that he was looking for Melcher, whose name Hatami did not recognize. Hatami told him the place was the Polanski residence and then advised him to try the path to the guest house beyond the main house. Tate appeared behind Hatami in the house's front door and asked him who was calling. Hatami and Tate maintained their positions while Manson went back to the guest house without a word, returned to the front a minute or two later and left.

That evening, Manson returned to the property and again went to the guest house. He entered the enclosed porch and spoke with Altobelli, the owner, who had just come out of the shower. Manson asked for Melcher, but Altobelli felt that Manson was instead looking for him. It was later discovered that Manson had apparently been to the property on earlier occasions after Melcher left. Altobelli told Manson through the screen door that Melcher had moved to Malibu and said that he did not know his new address, although he did.

Altobelli told Manson he was leaving the country the next day, and Manson said he would like to speak with him upon his return. Altobelli said that he would be gone for more than a year. Manson said that he had been directed to the guest house by the persons in the main house. Altobelli asked Manson not to disturb his tenants. Altobelli and Tate flew together to Rome the next day. Tate asked him whether "that creepy-looking guy" had gone to see him at the guest house the day before.

== 1969–1971: Crimes and trial ==
=== Crowe shooting ===
Tex Watson became involved in drug dealing and robbed a 22-year-old rival named Bernard "Lotsapoppa" Crowe. Crowe allegedly responded with a threat to kill everyone at Spahn Ranch. In response, Manson shot Crowe on July 1, 1969, at Manson's Hollywood apartment. Manson's belief that he had killed Crowe was seemingly confirmed by a news report of the discovery of the dumped body of a Black Panther in Los Angeles.

Although Crowe was not a member of the Black Panthers, Manson concluded he had been and expected retaliation from the Panthers. He turned Spahn Ranch into a defensive camp, establishing night patrols by armed guards. Watson would later write, "Blackie was trying to get at the chosen ones." Manson brought in members of the Straight Satans Motorcycle Club to act as security.

=== Hinman murder ===
34-year-old Gary Hinman, a music teacher and graduate student at UCLA, had previously befriended members of the Family and allowed some to occasionally stay at his home in Topanga Canyon. According to Atkins, Manson believed Hinman was wealthy and sent her, Brunner, and Beausoleil to Hinman's home to convince him to join the Family and turn over the assets Manson thought Hinman had inherited. The three held Hinman hostage for two days in late July 1969, as he denied having any money. During this time, Manson arrived with a sword and slashed his face and ear. After that, Beausoleil stabbed Hinman to death, allegedly on Manson's instruction. Before leaving the residence, Beausoleil or one of the women used Hinman's blood to write "political piggy" on the wall and to draw a panther paw, a Black Panther symbol.

According to Beausoleil, he came to Hinman's house to recover money paid to Hinman for mescaline provided to the Straight Satans, that had supposedly been bad. Beausoleil added that Brunner and Atkins, unaware of his intent, went along to visit Hinman. Atkins, in her 1977 autobiography, wrote that Manson directed Beausoleil, Brunner and her to go to Hinman's and get the supposed inheritance of $21,000. She said that two days earlier Manson had told her privately that, if she wanted to "do something important", she could kill Hinman and get his money. Beausoleil was arrested on August 6, 1969, after he was caught driving Hinman's car. Police found the murder weapon in the tire well.

=== Tate murders ===
On the night of August 8, 1969, Watson took Atkins, Krenwinkel and Linda Kasabian to 10050 Cielo Drive. Watson later claimed that Manson had instructed him to go to the house and "totally destroy" everyone in it, and to do it "as gruesome as you can". Manson told the women to do as Watson instructed them.

The occupants of the Cielo Drive house that evening were Tate, aged 26, who was 8 1/2 months pregnant; her friend and former lover 35-year-old Jay Sebring, a noted celebrity hairstylist; Polanski's friend 32-year-old Wojciech Frykowski; and Frykowski's 25-year-old girlfriend Abigail Anne Folger, heiress to the Folgers coffee fortune and daughter of Peter Folger. Also present on the property were 19-year-old caretaker William Garretson and his friend, 18-year-old Steven Earl Parent. Polanski was in Europe working on a film. Music producer Quincy Jones was a friend of Sebring who had planned to join him that evening before changing his mind.

Watson and the three women arrived at Cielo Drive just past midnight on August 9. Watson climbed a telephone pole near the entrance gate and cut the phone line to the house. The group then backed their car to the bottom of the hill that led to the estate before walking back up to the house. Thinking that the gate might be electrified or equipped with an alarm, they climbed a brushy embankment to the right of the gate and entered the grounds.

Headlights approached the group from within the property, and Watson ordered the women to lie in the bushes. He stepped out and ordered the approaching driver, Parent, to halt. Watson leveled a .22 caliber revolver at Parent, who begged him not to hurt him, claiming that he would not say anything. Watson lunged at Parent with a knife, giving him a defensive slash wound on the palm of his hand that severed tendons and tore the boy's watch off his wrist, then shot him four times in the chest and abdomen, killing him in the front seat of his white 1965 AMC Ambassador coupe. Watson ordered the women to help push the car up the driveway.

Watson next cut the screen of a window, then told Kasabian to keep watch down by the gate; she walked over to Parent's car and waited. Watson removed the screen, entered through the window and let Atkins and Krenwinkel in through the front door. He whispered to Atkins and awoke Frykowski, who was sleeping on the living room couch. Watson kicked him in the head, and Frykowski asked him who he was and what he was doing there. Watson replied, "I'm the devil, and I'm here to do the devil's business."

On Watson's direction, Atkins found the house's three other occupants with Krenwinkel's help and forced them to the living room. Watson began to tie Tate and Sebring together by their necks with a long nylon rope which he had brought, then slung it over one of the living room's ceiling beams. Sebring protested the rough treatment of the pregnant Tate, so Watson shot him. Folger was taken momentarily back to her bedroom for her purse, and she gave the murderers $70. Watson then stabbed Sebring seven times. Frykowski's hands had been bound with a towel, but he freed himself and began struggling with Atkins, who stabbed at his legs with a knife. He fought his way out the front door and onto the porch, but Watson caught up with him, struck him over the head with the gun multiple times, stabbed him repeatedly and shot him twice.

Kasabian had heard "horrifying sounds" and moved toward the house from her position in the driveway. She told Atkins that someone was coming in an attempt to stop the murders. Inside the house, Folger escaped from Krenwinkel and fled out a bedroom door to the pool area. Krenwinkel pursued her and caught her on the front lawn, where she stabbed her and tackled her to the ground. Watson then helped kill her; her assailants stabbed her a total of twenty-eight times. Frykowski struggled across the lawn, but Watson continued to stab him, killing him. Frykowski suffered fifty-one stab wounds, and had also been struck thirteen times in the head with the butt of Watson's gun, that bent the barrel and broke off one side of the gun grip, which was recovered at the scene.

In the house, Tate pleaded to be allowed to live long enough to give birth and offered herself as a hostage in an attempt to save the life of her unborn child. Instead both Atkins and Watson stabbed Tate sixteen times, killing her. The coroner's inquest found that Tate was still alive when she was hanged with the nylon rope, although the cause of her death was determined as a "massive hemorrhage", while in Sebring's murder it was found that he was hanged lifeless.

According to Watson, Manson had told the women to "leave a sign—something witchy". Atkins wrote "pig" on the front door in Tate's blood. Atkins claims she did this to copycat the Hinman murder scene to get Beausoleil out of jail, who was in custody for that murder.

=== LaBianca murders ===
The four murderers plus Manson, Leslie Van Houten and Clem Grogan went for a drive the following night. Manson was allegedly displeased with the previous night's murders, so he told Kasabian to drive to a house at 3301 Waverly Drive in the Los Feliz section of Los Angeles. Located next door to a home where Manson and Family members had attended a party the previous year, it belonged to 44-year-old supermarket executive Leno LaBianca and his 43-year-old wife, Rosemary LaBianca, co-owner of a dress shop.

According to Atkins and Kasabian, Manson disappeared up the driveway and returned to say that he had tied up the house's occupants. Watson, Krenwinkel and Van Houten entered the property. Watson claims in his autobiography that Manson went up alone, then returned to take him up to the house with him. Manson pointed out a sleeping man through a window, and the two entered through the unlocked back door. Watson claims Manson roused the sleeping Leno LaBianca from the couch at gunpoint and had Watson bind his hands with a leather thong. Rosemary was brought into the living room from the bedroom, and Watson covered the couple's heads with pillowcases which he bound in place with lamp cords. Manson left, and Krenwinkel and Van Houten entered the house.

Watson had complained to Manson earlier of the inadequacy of the previous night's weapons. Watson sent the women from the kitchen to the bedroom, where Rosemary LaBianca had been returned, while he went to the living room and began stabbing Leno LaBianca with a chrome-plated bayonet. The first thrust went into his throat. Watson heard a scuffle in the bedroom and went in there to discover Rosemary LaBianca keeping the women at bay by swinging the lamp tied to her neck. He stabbed her several times with the bayonet, then returned to the living room and resumed attacking Leno, whom he stabbed a total of twelve times. He then carved the word "WAR" into his abdomen.

Watson returned to the bedroom and found Krenwinkel stabbing Rosemary with a knife from the kitchen. Van Houten stabbed her approximately sixteen times in the back and the exposed buttocks. Van Houten claimed at trial that Rosemary LaBianca was already dead during the stabbing. Evidence showed that many of the forty-one stab wounds had, in fact, been inflicted post-mortem. Watson then cleaned off the bayonet and showered, while Krenwinkel wrote "Rise" and "Death to pigs" on the walls and "Healter [sic] Skelter" on the refrigerator door, all in LaBianca's blood. She gave Leno LaBianca fourteen puncture wounds with an ivory-handled, two-tined carving fork, which she left jutting out of his stomach. She also planted a steak knife in his throat.

Meanwhile, Manson drove the other three Family members who had departed Spahn with him that evening to the Venice home of the Lebanese actor Saladin Nader. Manson left them there and drove back to Spahn Ranch, leaving them and the LaBianca killers to hitchhike home. According to Kasabian, Manson wanted his followers to murder Nader in his apartment, but Kasabian claims she thwarted this murder by deliberately knocking on the wrong apartment door and waking a stranger. The group abandoned the murder plan and left, but Atkins defecated in the stairwell on the way out.

=== Shea murder ===
35-year-old Hollywood stuntman Donald Jerome "Shorty" Shea was murdered on August 26, 1969, more than two weeks after the Tate–LaBianca murders, when Manson told Shea, Bruce Davis, Tex Watson, and Steve Grogan to go on a ride to a nearby car parts yard on the Spahn Ranch. According to Davis, he sat in the back seat with Grogan, who then hit Shea with a pipe wrench and Watson stabbed him. They brought Shea down a hill behind the ranch and stabbed and brutally tortured him to death. Bruce Davis recalled at his parole hearings:

I was in the car when Steve Grogan hit Shorty with the pipe wrench. Charles Watson stabbed him. I was in the backseat with... with Grogan. They took Shorty out. They had to go down the hill to a place. I stayed in the car for quite a while but what... then I went down the hill later on and that's when I cut Shorty on the shoulder with the knife, after he was... well, I don't know... I... I don't know if he was dead or not. He didn't bleed when I cut him on the shoulder.

When I showed up, you know, he was... he was incapacitated. I don't know if... you asked if he was unconscious, I don't know. He may or may not have been. He didn't seem conscious. He wasn't moving or saying anything. And it started off Manson handed me a machete as if I was supposed to... I mean I know what he wanted. But you know I couldn't do that. And I... in fact, I did touch Shorty Shea with a machete on the back of his neck, didn't break the skin. I mean I just couldn't do it. And then I threw the knife... and he handed me a bayonet and it... I just reached over and... I don't know which side it was on but I cut him right about here on the shoulder just with the tip of the blade. Sort of like saying "Are you satisfied, Charlie?"

And I turned around and walked away. And I... I was sick for about two or three days. I mean I couldn't even think about what I... what I had done.

In December 1977, Shea's skeletal remains were discovered on an undistinguished hillside near Santa Susana Road next to Spahn Ranch after Grogan, one of those convicted of the murder, agreed to aid authorities in the recovery of Shea's body by drawing a map to its location. According to the autopsy report, his body suffered multiple stab and chopping wounds to the chest, and blunt force trauma to the head.

=== Suspected murders ===
In total, Manson and his followers were convicted of nine counts of first-degree murder. However, the LAPD believes that the Family could have claimed up to twelve more victims. Cliff Shepard, a former LAPD Robbery-Homicide Division detective, said that Manson "repeatedly" claimed to have killed many others. Prosecutor Stephen Kay supported this assertion: "I know that Manson one time told one of his cellmates that he was responsible for 35 murders." Tate's younger sister, Debra Tate, has also claimed that investigators are "just scraping the surface" when it comes to the number of Manson's victims and has further elaborated on how Manson sent her a taunting map of the Panamint Range, with crosses on it that she believed were meant to represent buried bodies. This has resulted in several excavations that have been undertaken at Manson's Barker Ranch, but they have not resulted in any bodies being found.

- Nancy Warren, 64, and Clyda Dulaney, 24, were both found near Ukiah, California, at the antique store owned by Warren on October 13, 1968. They had both been beaten and strangled to death with thirty-six leather thongs. After the Family members were arrested, they became suspects when it was discovered that members of the Family had been in the Ukiah area at the time of the murders. However, no one in the Family was ever charged with the murders and no arrests were ever made in the case.
- Marina Elizabeth Habe, 17, was murdered on December 30, 1968. She was a student at the University of Hawaii home on vacation when she was murdered in Los Angeles. According to the autopsy report, Habe's throat had been slashed and she had received numerous knife wounds to the chest. She suffered multiple contusions to the face and throat, and had been garrotted. There was no evidence of rape. Habe was abducted outside the home of her mother in West Hollywood, 8962 Cynthia Avenue. A former Manson Family associate claimed members of the Family had known Habe and it was conjectured she had been one of their victims.
- Darwin Morell Scott, 64, was the uncle of Manson and the brother of Manson's father, Colonel Scott. On May 27, 1969, Scott was found brutally stabbed to death in his Ashland, Kentucky, apartment. His body was pinned to the kitchen floor with a butcher knife, and he had been stabbed nineteen times. After Manson's arrest, it was reported that local residents claimed to have seen a man resembling Manson using the alias, "Preacher", in the area at the time Darwin was murdered. Manson was on parole in California at the time of the murder, but the murder occurred when Manson was out of touch with his parole officers.
- Mark Walts, 16, was an acquaintance of the Family members and was even known to associate with them at the Spahn Ranch. On July 17, 1969, Walts hitchhiked to the Santa Monica Pier so he could go fishing. His fishing pole was found abandoned at the pier, and his body was found the next day near Mulholland Drive. He had been shot three times in the chest. Though the Family was reportedly "shocked" by Walts's murder, his brother was convinced that Manson was responsible for his death and even called him to directly accuse him of his murder. The Los Angeles Sheriff's Department investigated Spahn Ranch in regard to Walts's murder, but no links were found, and the murder was never solved.
- John Philip Haught, 22, was an Ohio native who had moved to California and met Manson in the summer of 1969. He joined the Manson Family and was amongst the group who was arrested in the October raid of the clan for the Tate-LaBianca murders; Manson suspected him of being an informant. On November 5, 1969, Haught was associating with some members of the Family. According to all present, Haught suddenly found a gun in the room, picked it up, and promptly shot himself while attempting a game of Russian roulette. However, when police investigated the death, they found that the gun, rather than having zero bullets and one spent shell casing, instead contained seven bullets and one spent shell. Moreover, the gun had been wiped free of prints. Additionally, a male witness who had held Haught's head after the shooting told Cohen he had entered the room to find a female Manson follower with the gun in her hand. Despite this, police concluded Haught had killed himself.
- James Sharp, 15, and Doreen Gaul, 19, were both found stabbed to death in an alley in Los Angeles on November 7, 1969. The murder of the two young Scientologists involved both being stabbed between fifty and sixty times. Police immediately noted the similarities to these murders and those of the Tate-LaBianca murders; the killings of Sharp and Gaul happened close to where the Labianca's lived. In Helter Skelter, author Vincent Bugliosi wrote that Gaul was rumoured to be a former girlfriend of Manson Family member Bruce Davis—Davis had lived at the same housing complex as Gaul, but in a police interview he denied knowing her.
- Reet Jurvetson, 19, was a young woman found stabbed to death on November 16, 1969. Her body was found with over one hundred and fifty stab wounds from a penknife to her neck and upper body, along with defensive wounds on her hands and arms. She had been disposed of along Mulholland Drive in Los Angeles, California. Some witnesses claimed to have seen a woman named "Sherry" who matched Jurvetson's description among members of the Manson Family, but it turned out that this individual was alive. Manson himself denied any involvement in killing Jurvetson. Detectives within the Los Angeles Police Department have noted "striking similarities" between the method of murder of both Jurvetson and Habe, but no firm connection between both murders has ever been established.
- Joel Pugh, 29, was found dead in the Talgarth Hotel in London, England, on December 1, 1969. His wrists had been cut and his throat was slit twice. British authorities listed the death a drug-induced suicide, saying Pugh had been depressed. Pugh was a Family member who was married to another member of the Family, Sandra Good. Stephen Kay and others claim Manson hated Pugh. "He had no reason to commit suicide, and Manson was very unhappy that Sandy was with Pugh", Kay has said. Pugh's death occurred when a number of Manson Family members were being arrested for the Tate-LaBianca murders. Manson follower Bruce Davis was in London at the time Pugh died.
- Ronald Hughes, 35, was an American attorney who represented Leslie Van Houten, a member of the Manson Family. Hughes disappeared while on a camping trip during a ten-day recess from the Tate-LaBianca murder trial in November 1970. The badly decomposed body of Hughes was found in March 1971 wedged between two boulders in Ventura County. It was rumoured, although never proven, that Hughes was murdered by the Family, possibly because he had stood up to Manson and refused to allow Van Houten to take the stand and absolve Manson of the crimes, though he might have perished in flooding. Attorney Stephen Kay has stated that while he is "on the fence" about the Family's involvement in Hughes' death, Manson had open contempt for Hughes during the trial. Kay added, "The last thing Manson said to him [Hughes] was, 'I don't want to see you in the courtroom again,' and he was never seen again alive." Family member Sandra Good stated that Hughes was "the first of the retaliation murders".
- On November 8, 1972, the body of 26-year-old Vietnam Marine combat veteran James Lambert Willett was found by a hiker near Guerneville, California. Months earlier, he had been forced to dig his own grave, and then was shot and poorly buried. His station wagon was found outside a house in Stockton where several Manson followers were living, including Priscilla Cooper, Lynette Fromme, and Nancy Pitman. Police forced their way into the house and arrested several of the people there. The body of Willett's 19-year-old wife Lauren Chavelle Willett was found buried in the basement. She had been killed very recently by a gunshot to the head, in what the Family members initially claimed was an accident. It was later suggested that she was killed out of fear that she would reveal who killed her husband. Michael Monfort pleaded guilty to murdering Lauren and Priscilla Cooper, James Craig, and Nancy Pitman pleaded guilty as accessories after the fact. Monfort and William Goucher later pleaded guilty to the murder of James, and James Craig pleaded guilty as an accessory after the fact. The group had been living in the house with the Willetts while committing various robberies. Shortly after killing Willett, Monfort had used Willett's identification papers to pose as Willett after being arrested for an armed robbery of a liquor store. Willett was not involved in the robberies and wanted to move away, but was presumably killed out of fear that he would talk to police.
- Laurence Merrick, 50, was an American film director and author. He is best known for co-directing the Oscar nominated documentary Manson in 1973. Sharon Tate was a former student at Merrick's Academy of Dramatic Arts. Merrick was killed by a gunman on January 26, 1977. He was shot in the back in the parking lot of his acting school. Merrick's murder went unsolved until October 1981 when 35-year-old Dennis Mignano confessed to police. At his subsequent trial, Mignano was found not guilty by reason of insanity and committed to a mental hospital. Mignano was an unemployed would-be actor and singer with a long history of psychiatric problems and a possible prior relationship with the Manson clan.
- Six months after the murder of Merrick, Mignano's sister Michele Mignano, 21, a topless dancer, was also murdered. Her body was found on June 13, 1977, 350 ft into a Western Pacific railroad tunnel in Niles Canyon. Authorities referred to her death as an "execution-style slaying" with her dying from exsanguination due to multiple gunshot wounds. A number of bullet cartridges were found near her body. She was shoeless yet fully clothed with jewelry so sexual assault and robbery were both ruled out as motives. Her murder has never been solved.

=== Investigation ===
The Tate murders became national news on August 9, 1969, after the Polanskis' housekeeper, Winifred Chapman, arrived for work that morning. On August 10, detectives of the Los Angeles County Sheriff's Department, which had jurisdiction in the Hinman case, informed Los Angeles Police Department detectives assigned to the Tate case of the bloody writing at the Hinman house. According to Vincent Bugliosi, because detectives believed the Tate murders were a consequence of a drug transaction, the Tate team initially ignored this and other evidence of similarities between the crimes.

During the Tate autopsies, detectives working on the Hinman case noticed similarities in the weapons used, the stab wounds, and the writing in blood on the walls. They brought the information to detectives working on the Tate murders. According to Detective Charlie Guenther, "Vince [Bugliosi] didn't want anything to do with the Hinman case. Hinman was a nothing case. Vince didn't want to prosecute it."

Held briefly as a Tate suspect, Garretson told police he had neither seen nor heard anything on the murder night. He was released on August 11, 1969, after undergoing a polygraph examination that indicated he had not been involved in the crimes. The LaBianca crime scene was discovered at 10:30 p.m. on August 10, approximately nineteen hours after the murders were committed, when 15-year-old Frank Struthers, Rosemary's son from a prior marriage and Leno's stepson, returned from a camping trip.

On August 12, 1969, the LAPD told the press it had ruled out any connection between the Tate and LaBianca homicides. On August 16, the sheriff's office raided Spahn Ranch and arrested Manson and twenty-five others, as "suspects in a major auto theft ring" that had been stealing Volkswagen Beetles and converting them into dune buggies. Weapons were seized, but because the search warrant had been misdated, the group was released a few days later. In a report at the end of August, the LaBianca detectives noted a possible connection between the bloody writings at the LaBianca house and "the singing group the Beatles' most recent album."

Still working separately from the Tate team, the LaBianca team checked with the sheriff's office in mid-October about possible similar crimes. They learned of the Hinman case and also learned that the Hinman detectives had spoken with Beausoleil's girlfriend, Kitty Lutesinger. She had been arrested a few days earlier with members of the Manson Family.

The arrests, for car thefts, had taken place at the desert ranches to which the Family had moved. A joint force of National Park Service Rangers and officers from the California Highway Patrol and the Inyo County Sheriff's Office: federal, state, and county personnel, had raided both the Myers and Barker ranches after following evidence left when Family members had burned an earthmover owned by Death Valley National Monument. The raiders had found stolen dune buggies and other vehicles, and arrested two dozen people, including Manson. A Highway Patrol officer found Manson hiding in a cabinet beneath Barker's bathroom sink.

Following up leads a month after they had spoken with Lutesinger, LaBianca detectives contacted members of a motorcycle gang Manson tried to recruit as bodyguards while the Family was at Spahn Ranch. Meanwhile, a dormitory mate of Susan Atkins informed LAPD of the Family's involvement in the crimes. Atkins was booked for the Hinman murder after she told sheriff's detectives that she had been involved in it. Transferred to Sybil Brand Institute, a detention center in Monterey Park, California, she had begun talking to bunkmates Ronnie Howard and Virginia Graham, to whom she gave accounts of the events in which she had been involved.

=== Apprehension ===
On December 1, 1969, the LAPD announced warrants for the arrest of Watson, Krenwinkel, and Kasabian in the Tate case; the suspects' involvement in the LaBianca murders was noted. Manson and Atkins, already in custody, were not mentioned. The connection between the LaBianca case and Van Houten, who was also among those arrested near Death Valley, had not yet been recognized. Watson and Krenwinkel were already under arrest, with authorities in McKinney, Texas, and Mobile, Alabama, having picked them up on notice from LAPD. Informed that a warrant was out for her arrest, Kasabian voluntarily surrendered to authorities in Concord, New Hampshire on December 2.

Physical evidence such as Krenwinkel's and Watson's fingerprints, which had been collected by LAPD at Cielo Drive, was augmented by evidence recovered by the public. On September 1, 1969, the distinctive .22-caliber Hi Standard "Buntline Special" revolver Watson used on Parent, Sebring, and Frykowski had been found and given to the police by Steven Weiss, a 10-year-old who lived near the Tate residence. In mid-December, when the Los Angeles Times published a crime account based on information Susan Atkins had given her attorney, Weiss's father made several phone calls which finally prompted LAPD to locate the gun in its evidence file and connect it with the murders via ballistics tests.

Acting on that same newspaper account, a local ABC television crew quickly located and recovered the bloody clothing discarded by the Tate killers. The knives discarded en route from the Tate residence were never recovered, despite a search by some of the same crewmen and by LAPD. A knife found behind the cushion of a chair in the Tate living room was apparently that of Susan Atkins, who lost her knife in the course of the attack.

The trial began on June 15, 1970. The prosecution's main witness was Kasabian, who, along with Manson, Atkins, and Krenwinkel, had been charged with seven counts of murder and one of conspiracy. Since Kasabian, by all accounts, had not participated in the killings, she was granted immunity in exchange for testimony that detailed the nights of the crimes. Originally, a deal had been made with Atkins in which the prosecution agreed not to seek the death penalty against her in exchange for her grand jury testimony on which the indictments were secured; once Atkins repudiated that testimony, the deal was withdrawn. Because Van Houten had participated only in the LaBianca killings, she was charged with two counts of murder and one of conspiracy.

Originally, Judge William Keene had reluctantly granted Manson permission to act as his own attorney. Due to Manson's conduct, including violations of a gag order and submission of "outlandish" and "nonsensical" pretrial motions, the permission was withdrawn before the trial's start. Manson filed an affidavit of prejudice against Keene, who was replaced by Judge Charles Older. On Friday, July 24, the first day of testimony, Manson appeared in court with an X carved into his forehead. He issued a statement that he was "considered inadequate and incompetent to speak or defend [him]self"—and had "X'd [him]self from [the establishment's] world." Over the following weekend, the female defendants duplicated the mark on their own foreheads, as did most Family members within another day or so.

The prosecution argued the triggering of "Helter Skelter" was Manson's main motive. The crime scene's bloody White Album reference, "helter skelter" and the writing of "pigs" was correlated with testimony about Manson predictions that the murders Black people would commit at the outset of Helter Skelter would involve the writing of "pigs" on walls in victims' blood. The defendants testified that the writing in blood on the walls was to copy that of the Hinman murder scene, not an apocalyptic race war. According to Bugliosi, Manson directed Kasabian to hide a wallet taken from the scene in the women's restroom of a service station near a Black neighborhood. However, as co-prosecutor Stephen Kay later pointed out the wallet was left about twenty miles away in a predominantly White neighborhood, Sylmar.

=== Ongoing disruptions ===
During the trial, Family members loitered near the entrances and corridors of the courthouse. To keep them out of the courtroom proper, the prosecution subpoenaed them as prospective witnesses, who would not be able to enter while others were testifying. When the group established itself in vigil on the sidewalk, some members wore sheathed hunting knives that, although in plain view, were carried legally. Each of them was also identifiable by the X on their forehead.

Some Family members attempted to dissuade witnesses from testifying. Prosecution witnesses Paul Watkins and Juan Flynn were both threatened; Watkins was badly burned in a suspicious fire in his van. Former Family member Barbara Hoyt, who had overheard Susan Atkins describing the Tate murders to Family member Ruth Ann Moorehouse, agreed to accompany the latter to Hawaii. There, Moorehouse allegedly gave her a hamburger spiked with several doses of LSD. Found sprawled on a Honolulu curb in a drugged semi-stupor, Hoyt was taken to the hospital, where she did her best to identify herself as a witness in the Tate–LaBianca murder trial. Before the incident, Hoyt had been a reluctant witness. After the attempt to silence her, her reticence disappeared.

On August 4, despite precautions taken by the court, Manson flashed the jury a Los Angeles Times front page whose headline was "Manson Guilty, Nixon Declares". This was a reference to a statement made the previous day when U.S. President Richard Nixon had decried what he saw as the media's glamorization of Manson. Voir dired by Judge Charles Older, the jurors contended that the headline had not influenced them. The next day, the female defendants stood up and said in unison that, in light of Nixon's remark, there was no point in going on with the trial.

On October 5, Manson was denied the court's permission to question a prosecution witness whom defense attorneys had declined to cross-examine. Leaping over the defense table, Manson attempted to attack the judge. Wrestled to the ground by bailiffs, he was removed from the courtroom with the female defendants, who had subsequently risen and begun chanting in Latin. Thereafter, Older allegedly began wearing a revolver under his robes.

=== Defense rests ===
On November 16, the prosecution rested its case. Three days later, after arguing standard dismissal motions, the defense stunned the court by resting as well, without calling a single witness. Shouting their disapproval, Atkins, Krenwinkel, and Van Houten demanded their right to testify.

In chambers, the women's lawyers told the judge their clients wanted to testify that they had planned and committed the crimes and that Manson had not been involved. By resting their case, the defense lawyers had tried to stop this. Van Houten's attorney, Ronald Hughes, vehemently stated that he would not "push a client out the window". In the prosecutor's view, it was Manson who was advising the women to testify in this way as a means of saving himself. Speaking about the trial in a 1987 documentary, Krenwinkel said, "The entire proceedings were scripted—by Charlie."

The next day, Manson testified. The jury was removed from the courtroom. According to Vincent Bugliosi it was to make sure Manson's address did not violate the California Supreme Court's decision in People v. Aranda by making statements implicating his co-defendants. However, Bugliosi argued Manson would use his hypnotic powers to unfairly influence the jury. Speaking for more than an hour, Manson said, among other things, that "the music is telling the youth to rise up against the establishment." He said, "Why blame it on me? I didn't write the music." "To be honest with you," Manson also stated, "I don't recall ever saying 'Get a knife and a change of clothes and go do what Tex says.'"

As the body of the trial concluded and with the closing arguments impending, defense attorney Hughes disappeared during a weekend trip. When Maxwell Keith was appointed to represent Van Houten in Hughes' absence, a delay of more than two weeks was required to permit Keith to familiarize himself with the voluminous trial transcripts. No sooner had the trial resumed, just before Christmas, than disruptions of the prosecution's closing argument by the defendants led Older to ban the four defendants from the courtroom for the remainder of the guilt phase. This may have occurred because the defendants were acting in collusion with each other and were simply putting on a performance, which Older said was becoming obvious.

=== Conviction and penalty phase ===
On January 25, 1971, the jury returned guilty verdicts against the four defendants on each of the twenty-seven separate counts against them. Not far into the trial's penalty phase, the jurors saw the defense that Manson—in the prosecution's view—had planned to present. Atkins, Krenwinkel, and Van Houten testified the murders had been conceived as "copycat" versions of the Hinman murder, for which Atkins now took credit. The killings, they said, were intended to draw suspicion away from Bobby Beausoleil by resembling the crime for which he had been jailed. This plan had supposedly been the work of, and carried out under the guidance of, not Manson, but someone allegedly in love with Beausoleil –Linda Kasabian. Among the narrative's weak points was the inability of Atkins to explain why, as she was maintaining, she had written "political piggy" at the Hinman house in the first place.

Midway through the penalty phase, Manson shaved his head and trimmed his beard to a fork; he told the press, "I am the Devil, and the Devil always has a bald head." In what the prosecution regarded as belated recognition on their part that imitation of Manson only proved his domination, the female defendants refrained from shaving their heads until the jurors retired to weigh the state's request for the death penalty. The effort to exonerate Manson via the "copycat" scenario failed. On March 29, 1971, the jury returned verdicts of death against all four defendants on all counts. On April 19, 1971, Judge Older sentenced the four to death.

== 1971–2017: Third imprisonment ==
=== 1970s–1980s ===
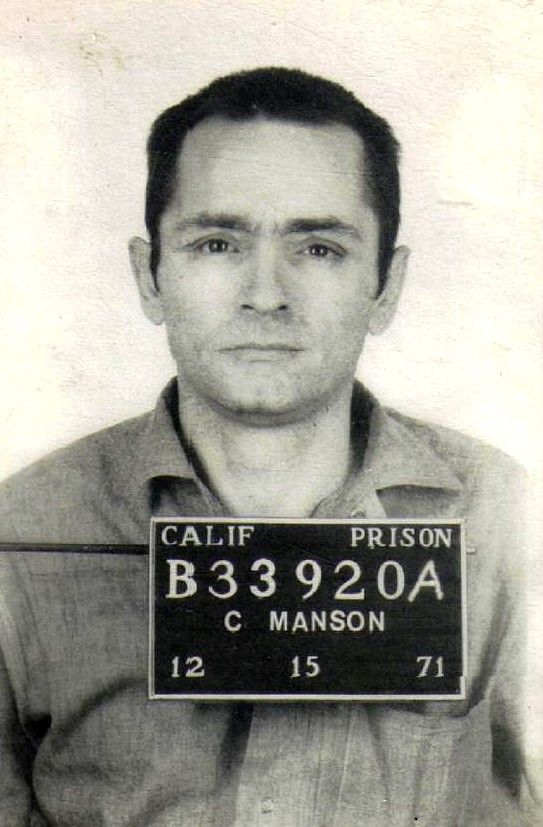
Manson's 1971 mugshot

Manson was admitted to state prison from Los Angeles County on April 22, 1971, for seven counts of first-degree murder and one count of conspiracy to commit murder for the deaths of Abigail Ann Folger, Wojciech Frykowski, Steven Earl Parent, Sharon Tate Polanski, Jay Sebring, and Leno and Rosemary LaBianca. In 1972, the California Supreme Court ruled that the state's death penalty statute was unconstitutional, and subsequently Manson was re-sentenced to life with the possibility of parole. His initial death sentence was modified to life on February 2, 1977.

On December 13, 1971, Manson was convicted of first-degree murder in Los Angeles County Court for the July 25, 1969, death of musician Gary Hinman. He was also convicted of first-degree murder for the August 1969 death of Donald Shea. Following the 1972 decision of California v. Anderson, California's death sentences were ruled unconstitutional and that "any prisoner now under a sentence of death ... may file a petition for writ of habeas corpus in the superior court inviting that court to modify its judgment to provide for the appropriate alternative punishment of life imprisonment or life imprisonment without possibility of parole specified by statute for the crime for which he was sentenced to death." Manson was thus eligible to apply for parole after seven years' incarceration. His first parole hearing took place on November 16, 1978, at California Medical Facility in Vacaville, where his petition was rejected.

==== Gerald Ford assassination attempt ====
On September 5, 1975, the Family returned to national attention when Squeaky Fromme attempted to assassinate U.S. President Gerald Ford. The attempt took place in Sacramento, to which Fromme and fellow Manson follower Sandra Good had moved so that they could be near Manson while he was incarcerated at Folsom State Prison. A subsequent search of the apartment shared by Fromme, Good, and another Family recruit turned up evidence that, coupled with later actions on the part of Good, resulted in Good's conviction for conspiring to send threatening communications through the United States mail service and for transmitting death threats by way of interstate commerce. The threats involved corporate executives and U.S. government officials vis-à-vis supposed environmental dereliction on their part.

Fromme was sentenced to 15 years to life, becoming the first person sentenced under United States Code Title 18, chapter 84 (1965), which made it a federal crime to attempt to assassinate the President of the United States. In December 1987, Fromme, serving a life sentence for the assassination attempt, escaped briefly from Federal Prison Camp, Alderson in West Virginia. She was trying to reach Manson because she heard that he had testicular cancer; she was apprehended within days. She was released on parole from Federal Medical Center, Carswell on August 14, 2009.

=== 1980s–1990s ===
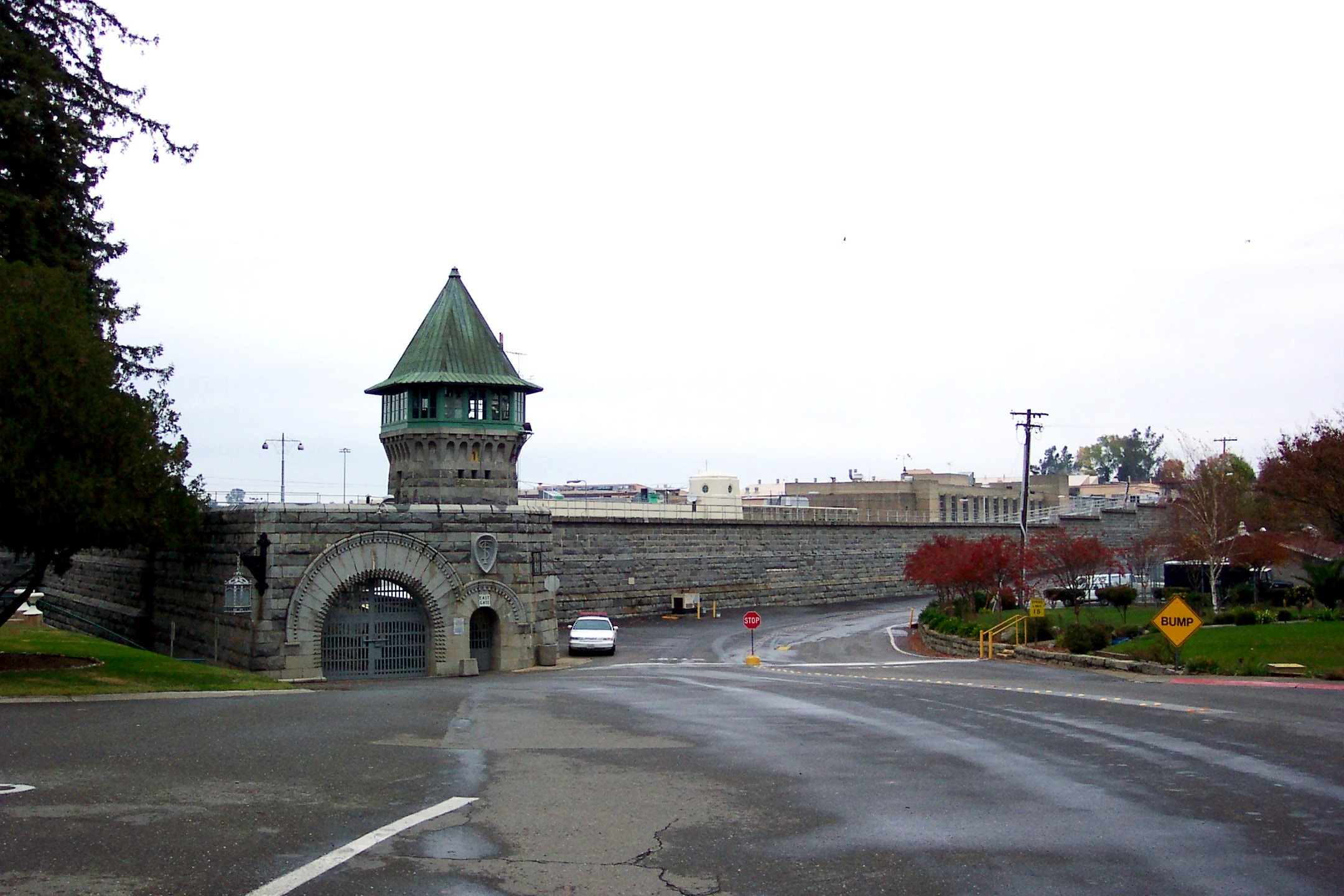
Folsom State Prison, where Manson spent time imprisoned

In the 1980s, Manson gave four interviews to the mainstream media. The first, recorded at California Medical Facility and aired on June 13, 1981, was by Tom Snyder for NBC's The Tomorrow Show. The second, recorded at San Quentin State Prison and aired on March 7, 1986, was by Charlie Rose for CBS News Nightwatch, and it won the national news Emmy Award for Best Interview in 1987. The third, with Geraldo Rivera in 1988, was part of the journalist's prime-time special on Satanism. At least as early as the Snyder interview, Manson's forehead bore a swastika in the spot where the X carved during his trial had been. Nikolas Schreck conducted an interview with Manson for his documentary Charles Manson Superstar. Schreck concluded Manson was not insane, but merely acting that way out of frustration.

On September 25, 1984, Manson was imprisoned in the California Medical Facility at Vacaville when inmate Jan Holmstrom poured paint thinner on him and set him on fire, causing second and third degree burns on over 20 percent of his body. Holmstrom explained that Manson had objected to his Hare Krishna chants and verbally threatened him. After 1989, Manson was housed in the Protective Housing Unit at California State Prison, Corcoran, in Kings County. The unit housed inmates whose safety would be endangered by general-population housing. He had also been housed at San Quentin State Prison, California Medical Facility in Vacaville, Folsom State Prison and Pelican Bay State Prison.

After his March 27, 1997 parole hearing, Manson refused to attend any of his later hearings.

In June 1997, a prison disciplinary committee found that Manson had been trafficking drugs. He was moved from Corcoran State Prison to Pelican Bay State Prison a month later.

=== 2000s–2017 ===
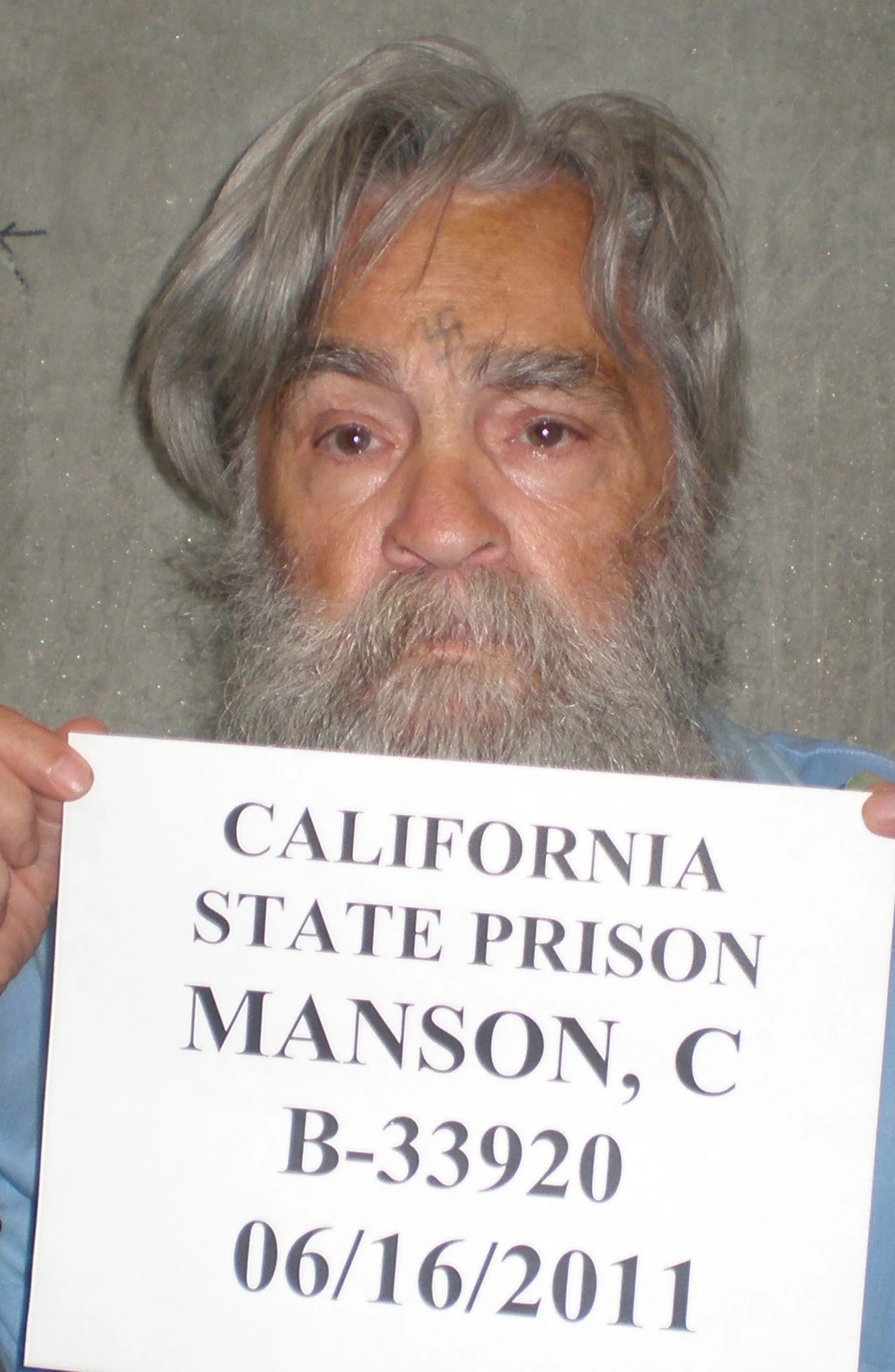
Manson, age 76, June 2011

On September 5, 2007, MSNBC aired The Mind of Manson, a complete version of a 1987 interview at California's San Quentin State Prison. The footage of the "unshackled, unapologetic, and unruly" Manson had been considered "so unbelievable" that only seven minutes of it had originally been broadcast on Today, for which it had been recorded.

In 2009, Los Angeles disc jockey Matthew Roberts released correspondence and other evidence indicating that he might be Manson's biological son. Roberts' biological mother claims that she was a member of the Manson Family who left in mid-1967 after being raped by Manson. She returned to her parents' home to complete the pregnancy, gave birth on March 22, 1968, and put Roberts up for adoption. CNN conducted a DNA test between Matthew Roberts and Manson's known biological grandson Jason Freeman in 2012, showing that Roberts and Freeman did not share DNA. Roberts subsequently attempted to establish that Manson was his father through a direct DNA test which proved definitively that Roberts and Manson were not related.

In 2010, the Los Angeles Times reported that Manson was caught with a cell phone in 2009 and had contacted people in California, New Jersey, Florida and British Columbia. A spokesperson for the California Department of Corrections stated that it was not known if Manson had used the phone for criminal purposes. Manson also recorded an album of acoustic pop songs with additional production by Henry Rollins, titled Completion. Only five copies were pressed: two belong to Rollins, while the other three are presumed to have been with Manson. The album remains unreleased.

On April 11, 2012, Manson was denied release at his twelfth and final parole hearing, which he did not attend. It was determined at that hearing that Manson's next parole hearing would be in fifteen years, or 2027, at which time he would have been 92.

In 2013, Manson stated that he was bisexual, saying "Sex to me is like going to the toilet. Whether it's a girl or not. It doesn't matter. I don't play that girl-guy shit. I'm not hung up in that game." In 2014, the imprisoned Manson became engaged to 26-year-old Afton Elaine Burton and obtained a marriage license on November 7. Manson gave Burton the nickname "Star". She had been visiting him in prison for at least nine years and maintained several websites that proclaimed his innocence. The wedding license expired on February 5, 2015, without a marriage ceremony taking place.

Journalist Daniel Simone reported that the wedding was canceled after Manson discovered that Burton wanted to marry him only so that she and friend Craig Hammond could use his corpse as a tourist attraction after his death. According to Simone, Manson believed that he would never die and may simply have used the possibility of marriage as a way to encourage Burton and Hammond to continue visiting him and bringing him gifts. Burton said on her website that the reason that the marriage did not take place was merely logistical. Manson had an infection and had been in a prison medical facility for two months and could not receive visitors. She said that she still hoped that the marriage license would be renewed and the marriage would take place.

== Psychology ==
The panel at Manson's March 27, 1997 hearing noted that Manson had a "history of controlling behavior" and "mental health issues" including schizophrenia and paranoid delusional disorder, and was too great a danger to be released. The panel noted that Manson had received 108 rule violation reports, had no indication of remorse, no insight into the causative factors of the crimes, lacked understanding of the magnitude of the crimes, had an exceptional, callous disregard for human suffering and had no parole plans.

In a 2023 re-analysis of Manson's psychological state, researchers suggested that he may have been misdiagnosed with schizophrenia. They proposed that Manson had bipolar disorder and psychopathy.

== Illness and death ==
On January 1, 2017, Manson was being held at Corcoran Prison, when he was rushed to Mercy Hospital in downtown Bakersfield, because he had gastrointestinal bleeding. A source told the Los Angeles Times that Manson was very ill, and TMZ reported that his doctors considered him "too weak" for surgery that normally would be performed in cases such as his. He was returned to prison on January 6, and the nature of his treatment was not disclosed. On November 15, 2017, an unauthorized source said that Manson had returned to a hospital in Bakersfield, but the California Department of Corrections and Rehabilitation did not confirm this in conformity with state and federal medical privacy laws. He died from cardiac arrest resulting from respiratory failure, brought on by colon cancer, at the hospital on November 19.

Three people stated their intention to claim Manson's estate and body. Manson's grandson Jason Freeman stated his intent to take possession of Manson's remains and personal effects. Manson's pen-pal Michael Channels claimed to have a Manson will dated February 14, 2002, which left Manson's entire estate and Manson's body to Channels. Manson's friend Ben Gurecki claimed to have a Manson will dated January 2017 which gives the estate and Manson's body to Matthew Roberts, another alleged son of Manson.

On March 12, 2018, the Kern County Superior Court in California decided in favor of Freeman in regard to Manson's body. A funeral service was held for Manson on March 17, 2018, after which Freeman had his remains cremated and scattered on a California hillside.

== Legacy ==
=== Cultural impact ===
In June 1970, Rolling Stone made Manson their cover story. Bernardine Dohrn of the Weather Underground reportedly said of the Tate murders: "Dig it, first they killed those pigs, then they ate dinner in the same room with them, then they even shoved a fork into the pig Tate's stomach! Wild!" Manson fanatic James Mason claimed to be acting on a suggestion from Charles Manson based on his interpretation of something Manson said in a televised interview, when Mason founded the Universal Order, a neo-Nazi group that has influenced other movements such as the terrorist group the Atomwaffen Division. Bugliosi quoted a BBC employee's assertion that a "neo-Manson cult" existed in Europe, represented by approximately 70 rock bands playing songs by Manson and "songs in support of him".

The original surnames of the Star Wars characters Luke Skywalker and his father Anakin Skywalker were revised in light of Manson's reputation in the 1970s. Written between January 1973 and March 1976, screenplays for Star Wars (1977) had used the names Luke and Annikin Starkiller, but after production of the movie began, George Lucas changed the surname to Skywalker. In 2007, Lucas explained "[he] felt a lot of people [on set] were confusing him with someone like Charles Manson. It had very unpleasant connotations." — Starkiller could be misconstrued as "celebrity killer" in a time when coverage on Manson was renewed following Fromme's attempted assassination of Gerald Ford, and Hollywood productions incorporated increased themes of sexual violence and gore following the sensationalizing of the Tate–LaBianca murders.

=== Music ===
Manson was a struggling pop musician, seeking to make it big in Hollywood between 1967 and 1969. The Beach Boys recorded one of his songs. Other songs were publicly released only after the trial for the Tate murders started. On March 6, 1970, LIE, an album of Manson music, was released. This included "Cease to Exist", a Manson song the Beach Boys had recorded with modified lyrics and the title "Never Learn Not to Love". Over the next couple of months only about 300 of the album's 2,000 copies sold.

There have been several other releases of Manson recordings – both musical and spoken. One of these, The Family Jams, includes two compact discs of Manson's songs recorded by the Family in 1970, after Manson and the others had been arrested. Guitar and lead vocals are supplied by Steve Grogan; additional vocals are supplied by Lynette Fromme, Sandra Good, Catherine Share, and others. One Mind, an album of music, poetry, and spoken word, new at the time of its release, in April 2005, was put out under a Creative Commons license.

American rock band Guns N' Roses recorded Manson's "Look at Your Game, Girl", included as an unlisted 13th track on their 1993 album "The Spaghetti Incident?" "My Monkey", which appears on Portrait of an American Family by the American rock band Marilyn Manson, includes the lyrics "I had a little monkey / I sent him to the country and I fed him on gingerbread / Along came a choo-choo / Knocked my monkey cuckoo / And now my monkey's dead." These lyrics are from Manson's "Mechanical Man", which is heard on LIE. Crispin Glover covered "Never Say 'Never' to Always" on his album The Big Problem ≠ The Solution. The Solution=Let It Be released in 1989.

Musical performers such as Kasabian, Spahn Ranch, and Marilyn Manson derived their names from Manson and his lore.

=== Documentaries ===
- 1973: Manson, directed by Robert Hendrickson and Laurence Merrick
- 1989: Charles Manson Superstar, directed by Nikolas Schreck
- 2014: Life After Manson, directed by Olivia Klaus
- 2017: Manson: Inside the Mind of a Mad Man, television documentary about Reet Jurvetsen.
- 2017: Murder Made Me Famous, Charles Manson: What Happened?
- 2017: Inside the Manson Cult: The Lost Tapes
- 2017: Charles Manson: The Final Words, narrated by Rob Zombie, focuses on the Manson Family murders told from Manson's perspective, directed by James Buddy Day.
- 2018: Inside the Manson Cult: The Lost Tapes, narrated by Liev Schreiber, looks inside the Manson Family.
- 2019: I Lived with a Killer: The Manson Family. Dianne Lake discusses what she witnessed of Manson's "peace-and-love hippie philosophy" as it became "dark, dangerous and evil".
- 2019: Charles Manson: The Funeral, directed by James Buddy Day.
- 2019: Manson: The Women, featuring Lynette "Squeaky" Fromme, Sandra "Blue" Good, Catherine "Gypsy" Share, and Dianne "Snake" Lake, documentary special on Oxygen, directed by James Buddy Day.
- 2020: Helter Skelter: An American Myth, six part TV miniseries directed by Lesley Chilcott.
- 2026: My Grandfather, Charles Manson. It was written by Manson’s granddaughter about her discovery that she was related to Manson.

=== Fiction inspired by Manson ===
- 1971: Sweet Savior, an exploitation film inspired from the case, but set in New York City. First fictional work about the case.
- 1976: Helter Skelter, a television drama.
- 1984: Manson Family Movies, a film drama.
- 1990: The Manson Family, a musical opera by John Moran.
- 1990: Assassins, a Broadway musical with references to Manson.
- 1992: The Ben Stiller Show, a sketch series with Manson as a recurring character portrayed by Bob Odenkirk.
- 1998: "Merry Christmas, Charlie Manson!", an episode of South Park centered around Manson.
- 2003: The Dead Circus, a novel that includes the activities of the Manson Family as a major plot point.
- 2003: The Manson Family, a crime drama/horror film centered around the Manson Family.
- 2004: Helter Skelter, a crime film about the Manson Family and about Linda Kasabian.
- 2006: Live Freaky! Die Freaky!, a stop-motion animated film based on the murders.
- 2014: House of Manson, a biographical feature film focusing on the life of Charles Manson from his childhood to his arrest.
- 2015: Manson Family Vacation, an indie comedy inspired by Manson.
- 2015–16: Aquarius, a television crime drama that includes storylines inspired by actual events which involved Manson.
- 2016: The Girls, a novel by Emma Cline loosely inspired by the Manson Family.
- 2016: Wolves at the Door, a horror film directed by John R. Leonetti loosely based on the murder of Sharon Tate.
- 2017: Mindhunter; the first episode of season 1 used Manson as a case study. Manson is then featured in the second season.
- 2017: American Horror Story: Cult, the seventh season of the horror anthology series American Horror Story.
- 2018: Charlie Says, a film centered around Manson and three of his followers.
- 2019: The Haunting of Sharon Tate; directed by Daniel Farrands, the film revolves around Sharon Tate during the last evening of her life.
- 2019: Once Upon a Time in Hollywood; directed by Quentin Tarantino, the film has a plot revolving around Manson and the Manson Family, though Manson himself only appears briefly.
- 2019: Zeroville, a film that starts in the aftermath of the Sharon Tate murders in Los Angeles, with the main character suspected of being involved. Manson is portrayed by Scott Haze.
- 2021: We Can Only Save Ourselves, a novel by Alison Wisdom loosely inspired by the Manson Family.

== Discography ==
- Lie: The Love and Terror Cult (1970)
- Live at San Quentin (1993)
- The Family Jams (1997)
- One Mind (2005)

Posthumous releases

- The Summer of Hate: The '67 Sessions (2024)

== See also ==
- ATWA, an ecological belief system propounded by Manson and followers. ATWA is an acronym for "Air, Trees, Water, Animals and All The Way Alive."
