= Cease to Exist =

Cease to Exist may refer to:

- "Cease to Exist" (song), by Suicide Silence, 2014
- "Cease to Exist", a song written by Charles Manson, rewritten and recorded by the Beach Boys as "Never Learn Not to Love"
- "Cease to Exist", a 1989 song by Meat Beat Manifesto from the album Storm the Studio RMXS
- "Cease to Exist", a 1994 song by Cobra Verde from the album Viva la Muerte
- "Cease to Exist", a 1996 song by Earth Crisis from the album Gomorrah's Season Ends
- "Cease to Exist", a 1998 song by Tristania from the album Widow's Weeds
- "Cease to Exist", a 2010 song by Rob Zombie from the album Hellbilly Deluxe 2
- Cease to Exist, a 2007 DVD by World Burns to Death
