= The Dead Circus =

2003 novel by John Kaye

- Dust-jacket from the first edition
- Author: John Kaye
- Language: English
- Genre: Novel
- Publisher: Grove Press(publisher)
- Publication date: 2003
- Publication place: United States
- Media type: Print (Hardcover, Paperback)
- Pages: 336 pp
- ISBN: 0-8021-4017-3

The Dead Circus is a neo-noir crime novel set in 1960s–80s Los Angeles by John Kaye. The novel was shortlisted by The New York Times for their Book of the Year list in 2003.

== Plot details ==
It is set in 1986 and following the storyline of Kaye's first novel Stars Screaming, Gene Burk has just lost his fiancée in an airplane crash. Afraid that he will lose himself entirely to his grief, Gene starts to obsess over the 20-year-old mysterious death of rockabilly newcomer Bobby Fuller. He had worked the case, unsuccessfully, when he was a cop with the LAPD, and as he begins to reopen old leads, he starts to shake up the wrong people, putting his own life in danger. Gene is then contacted by Alice McMillan, a former member of the Manson family who needs his help in putting that life behind her once and for all. They ultimately venture off together into Death Valley in search of Charles Manson's 16 mm snuff films that may contain the answers Gene is looking for regarding the circumstances of Fuller's death.
