= Lie: The Love and Terror Cult =

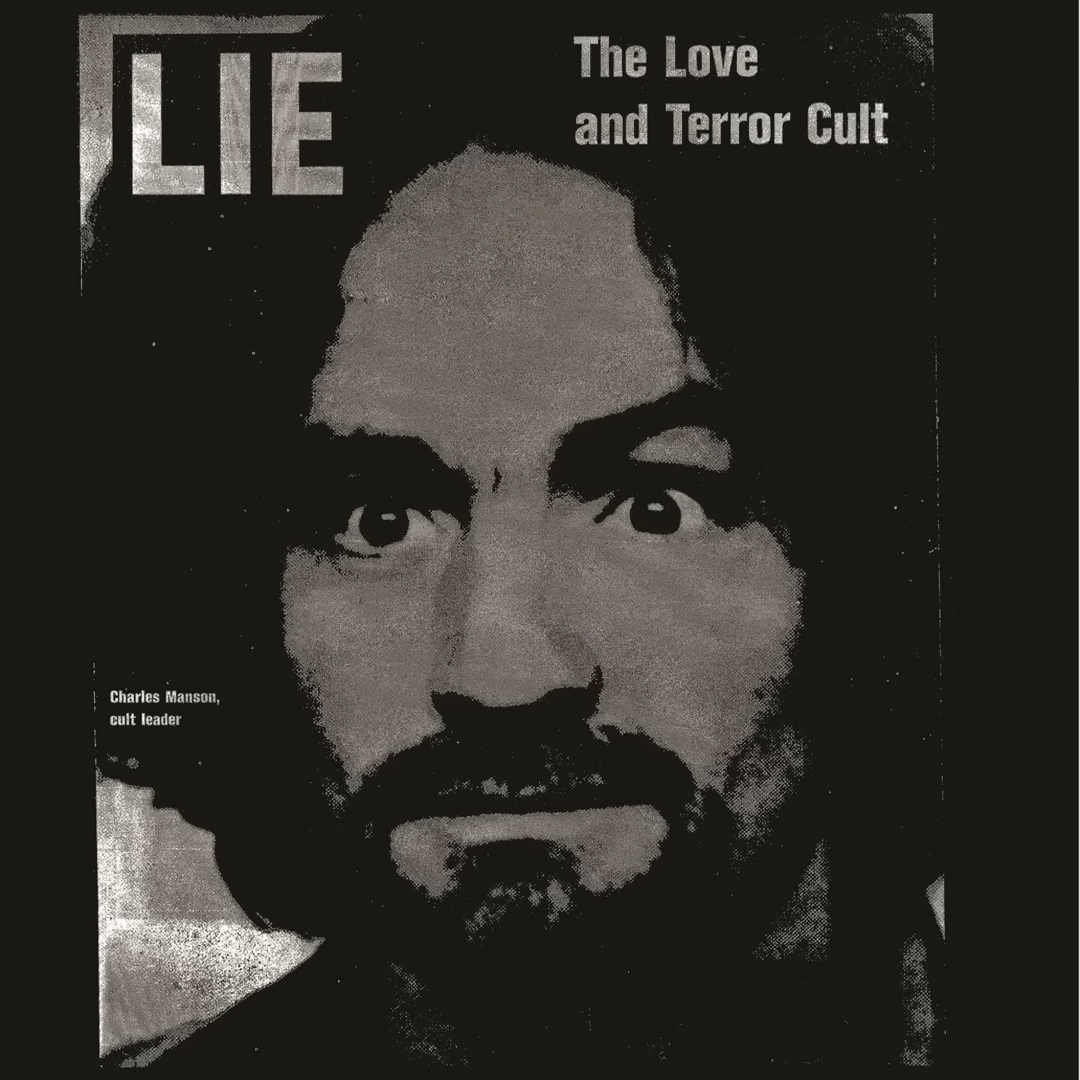

Studio album by Charles Manson
- Released: March 6, 1970
- Recorded: June 1967; September 11, 1967; August 8–9, 1968
- Studio: Gold Star Studios, Los Angeles; unknown studio in Van Nuys, LA
- Genre: Folk; psychedelic folk; folk rock
- Length: 31:53
- Label: Awareness Records
- Producer: Phil Kaufman

Charles Manson chronology
Lie: The Love and Terror Cult (1970)	The Family Jams (1997)

Professional ratings
Review scores
Source	Rating
All About Jazz	(favorable)
Mojo	(favorable)
AllMusic	4/5 stars

Lie: The Love and Terror Cult is the debut studio album by American musician and convicted murderer Charles Manson. It was released on vinyl on March 6, 1970, by Phil Kaufman, through a record label branded Awareness Records. Although not a commercial success, it retains a following among those interested in the Manson case, inspiring many cover versions and samples. The album includes some of Manson's best known songs, including "Look at Your Game, Girl" and "Cease to Exist" (the latter had been recorded by the Beach Boys as "Never Learn Not to Love").

The cover is a parody of the December 19, 1969, Life magazine cover, which featured Manson along with the headline "The Love and Terror Cult". The two covers are mostly identical; however, the "F" in "LIFE" has been deleted and the line "The dark edge of hippie life" has been removed. The date and price are replaced with the Awareness Records logo.

== Background ==
In 1968, Phil Kaufman, who had met Manson in prison, moved in briefly with Manson and his "Family". Kaufman continually urged Manson to record some of the songs that Manson had written. Over the summer of 1968, Manson attempted to construct an album with members of the Beach Boys. Carl and Brian Wilson co-produced about ten songs by Manson that he recorded at the Beach Boys' personal studio. These tapes remain unreleased, though the songs themselves may overlap with the material present on Lie: The Love and Terror Cult. In December 1968, the Beach Boys released their version of Manson's "Cease to Exist" as a single B-side, except the lyrics were changed and the title was altered to "Never Learn Not to Love", which angered Manson.

In August 1969, members of the Manson Family committed several murders and were apprehended three months later. While Manson was being held on the charges, he told Kaufman "please put out my music". According to Kaufman, Manson phoned him five days a week, even though he was allowed only three phone calls per day. Manson was "very anxious for his music to be heard".

== Recording ==
According to the album's original sleeve notes, Lie: The Love and Terror Cult was recorded primarily at Gold Star Studios on August 8, 1968, with track B3, "Sick City", recorded September 11, 1967 in an unspecified location. Overdubs were recorded on August 9, 1968 somewhere in Van Nuys, Los Angeles. Two tracks from the album, "Look at Your Game, Girl" and "Eyes of a Dreamer", were recorded in June 1967 at a demo session for Uni Records (a subsidiary of MCA). These 2 songs appeared on a privately pressed 45 rpm single credited to "Silverhorn". When Phil Kaufman was mastering the Lie LP, he had to take these 2 tracks from a copy of the 45, as the master tapes were already lost.

== Release ==
After established record companies declined to become involved, Kaufman raised $3,000 and pressed 2,000 copies of an album entitled Lie: The Love and Terror Cult on March 6, 1970 through a record label called Awareness Records. It was distributed on the West Coast, by Trademark of Quality, the bootlegging group who released the first notable bootleg album, Great White Wonder, a collection of pirated Bob Dylan tapes. Consisting of the recordings made from 1967 to 1968, the album contained thirteen songs. These included "Cease to Exist", a song The Beach Boys had recorded in modified form as "Never Learn Not to Love". Its album cover is a copy of the December 19, 1969 Life front cover on which Manson had appeared, only with "Life" replaced with the word "Lie". Each of the original 2,000 copies came with a poster that was put out by "A Joint Venture" and that bore signatures of many prisoners and inmates, all supporting Manson and the Family. Only 300 sold. Having supposedly failed to recover his investment, Kaufman signed an agreement with New York-based ESP-Disk to distribute the album nationally.

During the 1991 Ron Reagan Jr. interview with Charles Manson, Manson stated that "That particular album was made off a little old $7 tape recorder, and it was put together as a promotion angle, and the guy made six or seven hundred thousand dollars. My music is not on tape."

== Covers and sampling ==
"Cease to Exist" had been previously recorded by The Beach Boys under the name "Never Learn Not to Love", and it appears both on their 1969 album 20/20 and as the B-side of the single of "Bluebirds over the Mountain". Manson was not given co-writing credit. The Beach Boys' version includes such significant changes as the inclusion of a bridge that was not part of Manson's version, and the change of the line "Cease to exist" to "Cease to resist", which alters the meaning of the song.

Portions of the album have been sampled or covered by many other artists, such as Front Line Assembly. Many of the songs have also been re-recorded; a version of "Look at Your Game, Girl" appears as a hidden track on the Guns N' Roses cover album "The Spaghetti Incident?", while GG Allin covered "Garbage Dump" for his 1987 album You Give Love a Bad Name. Redd Kross and The Lemonheads have both covered "Cease to Exist". The Lemonheads recorded two other songs from the album, a version of "Home Is Where You're Happy" appeared on the 1988 album Creator and Evan Dando reappropriated some of the lyrics and melody of "Big Iron Door" into his song "Clang Bang Clang" (later re-recorded as "Left for Dead", which appears on the group's 1990 album Lovey). In 1989 actor Crispin Glover recorded a cover of "I'll Never Say Never to Always" (under the slightly altered title of "Never Say 'Never' to Always") for his debut album The Big Problem Does Not Equal the Solution, The Solution Equals Let It Be.

In the 1976 TV movie Helter Skelter, actor Steve Railsback, who portrayed Manson, sings “Garbage Dump” and two other songs from the Family Jams album.

The Brian Jonestown Massacre included a reworked version of "Arkansas" (called "Arkansas Revisited") on their 1999 EP Bringing It All Back Home – Again. Frontman Anton Newcombe frequently cites Manson as an influence, even claiming to have recorded with Manson.

An acoustic version of the song "Sick City" was recorded by Marilyn Manson, but this has never been officially released. The Marilyn Manson song "My Monkey", from the album Portrait of an American Family, contains samples of Charles Manson speaking, as well as lyrics from the track "Mechanical Man".

Devendra Banhart did a version of "Home Is Where You're Happy".

Musician Travis Miller, under his alias Lil Ugly Mane, released a song called "Iron Door" on his 2013 album Three Sided Tape Volume One, which features vocals samples from Manson's "Big Iron Door".

In the 2018 film Her Smell, the character of Becky Something, played by Elisabeth Moss, plays and sings a few lines from "Garbage Dump."

The 2023 videogame The Texas Chain Saw Massacre features several of Manson's songs including "I'll Never Say Never to Always", sung by Kristina Klebe as the voice of Sissy. In the game, Sissy is a former Manson Family member whose character concept was made for the original 1974 film, yet scrapped and never saw the light of day until Kim Henkel, the licenseholder and writer of the first film, recommended her character be added to the game.

== Reception ==
Retrospective reviews of the album have been largely positive, though critics have noted the difficulty of separating Manson's music from his subsequent crimes.

AllMusic described the best material on Lie as reminiscent of other folksingers of the era, particularly Jim Croce and José Feliciano. Raul D'Gama Rose of All About Jazz gave Lie 3 stars out of a possible 5 and described the album as "a significant musical document, considering it is a reflection of the popular counterculture" of the late 1960s; while it falls short of better contemporary work by Bob Dylan or John Sebastian, nonetheless several songs "stood up to the test of time" including "Look at Your Game, Girl", "Cease to Exist", "Eyes of a Dreamer" and "The More You Learn to Love.".

== Track listing ==
All tracks are written by Charles Manson.

Side A
No.	Title	Length
1.	"Look at Your Game, Girl"	2:03
2.	"Ego"	2:27
3.	"Mechanical Man"	3:18
4.	"People Say I'm No Good"	3:20
5.	"Home Is Where You're Happy"	1:29
6.	"Arkansas"	3:03
7.	"I'll Never Say Never to Always"	0:41

Side B
No.	Title	Length
1.	"Garbage Dump"	2:34
2.	"Don't Do Anything Illegal"	2:52
3.	"Sick City"	1:36
4.	"Cease to Exist"	2:12
5.	"Big Iron Door"	1:10
6.	"I Once Knew a Man"	2:33
7.	"Eyes of a Dreamer"	2:35

2006 ESP-Disk CD bonus tracks
No.	Title	Length
15.	"Devil Man"	3:15
16.	"The More You Love"	1:41
17.	"Two Pairs of Shoes"	1:56
18.	"Maiden with Green Eyes (Remember Me)"	1:24
19.	"Swamp Girl"	1:58
20.	"Bet You Think I Care"	2:12
21.	"Look At Your Game, Girl (Alternate Version)"	1:45
22.	"Interview"	3:17
23.	"Who to Blame"	2:26
24.	"True Love You Will Find"	2:52
25.	"My World"	1:45
26.	"Invisible Tears"	1:33

== Reissues (counterfeit not listed) ==
All proceeds from one reissue of the album, released by Awareness Records, were donated to a California fund for victims of violent crime, as California law prohibited Manson himself from collecting any money or royalties for his work.

In 2006, the album was reissued by the revived ESP-Disk label. This version included twelve bonus tracks. A label employee confirmed that all artist royalties would go to the family of Wojciech Frykowski, whom members of the Manson Family was convicted of having murdered.

Year	Album details	Additional information
1970	LIE. The Love and Terror Cult: Released: 1970, U.S.; Label: Awareness Records; Formats: LP	(official and first release, no. A-2144 & B-22145 (on disc labels))
1970	LIE. The Love and Terror Cult: Released: 1970, U.S.; Label: ESP-DISK; Formats: LP	13 Songs Composed and Performed by Charles Manson Accompanied by the Family. ' (official release, no. ESP-2003 (on cover); ESP-2003 (2144) & ESP-2003 (2145) (on disc labels))
1970	LIE. The Love and Terror Cult: Released: 1970, U.S.; Label: ESP-DISK; Formats: MC	13 Songs Composed and Performed by Charles Manson With Vocal & Instrumental Accompaniment by the Family. ' (official release, no. 2003-C)
1971	12 Canciones. Compuestas y Cantadas por Charles Manson: Released: 1971, Spain; Label: Movieplay; Formats: LP	'12 Canciones. Compuestas y Cantadas por Charles Manson' (official, produced in license from ESP-DISK, no. M-24025).
1981	LIE: Released: 1981, UK; Label: Come Organisation; Formats: MC	(semi-official rerelease, no. wdc883008 - two different cover releases)
1987	LIE. The Love and Terror Cult: Released: 1987, U.S.; Label: Awareness Records; Formats: LP	(official, no. 08903-0156 (on cover) Aware 1 (on disk label)
1987	LIE. The Love and Terror Cult: Released: 1987, U.S.; Label: Awareness Records; Formats: CD	(official, no. Aware1CD; 08903=0156)
1987	LIE. The Love and Terror Cult: Released: 1987, U.S.; Label: Awareness Records; Formats: MC	(official, no. Aware1C; 08903=0156)
1993	Charles Manson: Released: 1993, UK; Label: Grey Matter; Formats: CD	(official, no. GM05CD - also includes the songs from the album 'The Manson Family Sings the Songs of Charles Manson' recorded in 1970, originally released on LP in 1992 by Commodity.)
2006	Sings / LIE. The Love and Terror Cult: Released: 2006, U.S.; Label: ESP-DISK; Formats: CD	This is the LIE album but released as 'Sings' on the back cover. The front cover is the traditional cover but with a red background behind the word LIE but the rest of the cover is the same with 'The Love and Terror Cult'(official release, no. ESP 2003)
2006	LIE: The 1967 LP: Released: 2006, U.S.; Label: White Devil Records; Formats: CD-R	(official release, no number)
2008	Sings / LIE. The Love and Terror Cult: Released: 2008, U.S.; Label: ESP-DISK; Formats: CD	(official release, new version of the 2006 edition by ESP-DISK issued as a digipack - 26 tracks). This is the LIE album but released as 'Sings' on the back cover. The front cover is the traditional cover but with a red background behind the word LIE but the rest of the cover is the same with 'The Love and Terror Cult'
2023	LIE: The Love and Terror Cult (Remastered): Released: 2023, U.S.; Formats: Digital streaming	(official release, remastered, alternate cover art, no catalog number)

== Personnel ==
- Charles Manson: lead vocals, rhythm guitar, timpani
- Bobby Beausoleil: electric guitar
- Steve "Clem" Grogan: electric bass
- Paul Watkins: French horn
- Catherine Share: violin, backup vocals
- Dianne Lake: recorder
- Mary Brunner: flute, vocals on Track 4
- Nancy Pitman: vocals on Track 6
- Sandra Good, Lynette Fromme, Nancy Pitman: backup vocals
- Producer – Phil Kaufman
