= Live at San Quentin (Charles Manson album) =

Live album by Charles Manson
- Released: 1993
- Recorded: 1983, California Medical Facility
- Genre: Folk; lo-fi
- Length: 56:21
- Label: Grey Matter
- Producer: Charles Manson

Charles Manson chronology
Son of Man (1992)	Live at San Quentin (1993)	Charles Manson (1993)

Live at San Quentin is a bootleg album by American folk musician and convicted murder-conspirator Charles Manson, and was released on Grey Matter Records, in 1993. The album consists of live recordings produced by Manson directly from his cell in the California Medical Facility in 1983. As a result, the tracks suffer from poor sound quality, and various noises from the penitentiary interject throughout the album. All of the material on Live at San Quentin was distributed earlier on the rare cassette White Rasta.

== Background ==
Faced with serving a life sentence for conspiracy to commit the murders of seven people, Manson was transferred from Folsom State Prison to California Medical Facility (CMF) in March 1974 as his mental condition showed signs of deteriorating. He was returned to Folsom in October 1974, but was transferred yet again to CMF two years later, where he remained incarcerated for nine years.

The contents of the album consists of material Manson recorded, while accompanying himself on acoustic guitar, on a portable cassette tape deck during a lock-up at CMF. Because of the settings at the time of recording and the rudimentary equipment used, much of Live at San Quentin's contents are interrupted by inmate bantering and various noises. Although some tracks like "My Name Is Sam McGee", "Boxcar Willy and Big Bad Joe", and "Marilyn Monroe Was My Childhood Shame" make references to pop culture, much of the material manifests itself from Manson's improvisatory declarations.

== Release ==
Of the 13 tracks that make up Live at San Quentin, all of them were first introduced on the cassette tape White Rasta in the late 1980s. Directed by Manson Family members "Ansom 13" and "TJ", a limited edition of 500 tapes were intended for distribution, but that number dwindled to 250 copies. It features the same cover design as Manson's "I'm on Fire" single. However, White Rasta is nearly impossible to obtain and is currently out of print.

Live at San Quentin was released in 1993 by Grey Matter Records (including a limited edition "yellow" version) on vinyl LP and CD. Cover art for the album parodies Pet Sounds by the Beach Boys, whose drummer Dennis Wilson briefly befriended Manson. Sleevenotes are brandished with an excerpt of Manson proclaiming his innocence and also elaborates on the album's unconventional track listing.

Noting the situation in which the album was recorded, a review on the Allmusic website commented "the authenticity of Charles Manson Live at San Quentin places it with other historic prison recordings, even as it occupies a micro-genre all its own". Stephen Kaplan, distributor of Lie: The Love and Terror Cult in the 1980s, wrote "Kids buy it thinking they are going to get devil-worship music. But when they get home and find they have an album of mediocre folk songs, a lot of them are disappointed".

== Track listing ==
=== Side one ===
1. "Boxcar Willie and Big Bad Joe" – 4:43
2. "Television Mind" – 2:57
3. "Marilyn Monroe Was My Childhood Shame" – 2:06
4. "Instrumental " – 2:07
5. "And as I Told You on This Chord Once Before" – 3:37
6. "So as the Hour Goes on That I Will Spend with You" – 6:44
7. "I Got a Tough Bastard Child Want to Become Into a Samurai – 4:56
8. "So Today Has Been a Good Day" – 0:58

=== Side two ===
1. "My Name Is Sam McGee" – 1:48
2. "Take Me to the Summer Road" – 9:13
3. "My Feelings Begin to Grow" – 4:06
4. "And I'd Like to Say Hello to Some of My Friends" – 5:02
5. "So the Mood Was Broken" – 8:01

== Personnel ==
- Charles Manson – lead vocals, acoustic guitar
