= Bifurcation (law) =

Judge's ability in law to divide a trial into two parts

Bifurcation is a judge's ability in law to divide a trial into two parts so as to render a judgment on a set of legal issues without looking at all aspects. Frequently, civil cases are bifurcated into separate liability and damages proceedings. Criminal trials are also often bifurcated into guilt and sentencing phases, especially in capital cases.

In divorce cases, some states allow bifurcation, that permits a divorce case to be finalized with certain aspects, such as property, to be dealt with after dissolution. Some states permit bifurcation, some do not allow it, and some state statutes do not address the issue.

In arbitration, bifurcation can be used to get past certain issues, that might otherwise stall negotiations, concluding certain points that are agreed upon, while working on a solution to whatever problem initiated the need for bifurcation.

== Bifurcation under the Federal Rules of Civil Procedure ==
In Federal Court, judges have wide discretion to structure trials. Factors evaluated will include congruence of issues, complexity for the jury, and possible prejudice to any of the parties. American Federal Rules of Civil Procedure, Rule 42(b) allows the court to decide issues contained in separate trials.

== Bifurcation under state procedure ==
State procedures differ widely.

In some states, a defendant who has raised the defense of mental disease or defect will automatically create a bifurcated trial. In the first stage of the trial, both sides present evidence and testimony designed to establish that the defendant is either guilty or not guilty. If the defendant is guilty, the issue of mental disease is presented.

== Bifurcation in divorce ==
States have historically taken different views on bifurcation but most state statutes do not address the subject. Alaska permits the courts, under certain circumstances, to divide the parties' property "at any time after the judgment". Alaska Stat. 25.24.155(b) and Alaska Stat. 25.24.160 (Michie 1996). Michigan law, Mich. Ct. R. 3.211(B)(3) (1998) directs that a judgment of divorce must include a determination of the parties' property rights. The New Jersey Supreme Court, in Frankel v. Frankel, 274 N.J. Super. 585, 644 A.2d 1132 (App. Div. 1994), prohibits bifurcation except in the most unusual and extenuating circumstances. Some states, by law, preclude bifurcation. The Nebraska Nebraska Supreme Court, held that all issues must be resolved at the time of dissolution, and in Humphrey v. Humphrey, 214 Neb. 664, 340 N.W.2d 381 (1983), concluded, "Whatever personal convenience a court may confer on parties by granting an immediate dissolution while retaining property jurisdiction cannot be worth the difficulties and problems to which the trial court is exposing the litigants.". The Arizona Supreme Court, in Porter v. Estate of Pigg, 175 Ariz. 303, 856 P.2d 796 (1993), held that bifurcation to "resolve issues of marriage dissolution and property distribution is error", and in Brighton v. Superior Court, 22 Ariz. App. 291, 526 P.2d 1089 (1974), that bifurcation would fostered rather than deter litigation. A Texas Court of Appeals, Adam v. Stewart, 552 S.W.2d 536 (Tex. Civ. App. 1977), disapproved of bifurcation. The Third Department of New York's Appellate Division, Busa v. Busa, 196 A.D.2d 267, 609 N.Y.S.2d 452 (1994), Sullivan v. Sullivan, 174 A.D.2d 862, 571 N.Y.S.2d 154 (1991), and Garcia v. Garcia, 178 A.D.2d 683, 577 N.Y.S.2d 156 (1991), held that a divorce decree is nonbinding and without legal effect if including bifurcation and without making an award of equitable distribution at the time of dissolution, while the Fourth Department, Zack v. Zack, 183 A.D.2d 382, 590 N.Y.S.2d 632 (1992), rejected these decisions supported by Johnson, 172 Misc. 2d 684, 658 N.Y.S.2d 780 (Sup. Ct. 1997).

== Bifurcation in arbitration ==
Arbitral tribunals may bifurcate proceedings into separate stages in cases involving complex issues, to allow for a decision on one phase before considering issues relevant to another phase (for instance, jurisdiction, merits, damages), in the interests of procedural economy and where such a decision would not prejudge any subsequent decision. The American Arbitration Association (AAA), the International Centre for the Settlement of Investment Disputes (ICSID), the World Intellectual Property Organization (WIPO) and the United Nations Commission on International Trade Law (UNCITRAL) rules allow for bifurcation, while the International Chamber of Commerce (ICC) rules don't address the issue.
