= The Family Jams =

Studio album by The Manson Family
- Released: 1997
- Recorded: 1970
- Genre: Folk rock
- Label: Transparency Records; Aoroa Records

Charles Manson chronology
Lie: The Love and Terror Cult (1970)	The Family Jams (1997)	One Mind (2005)

The Family Jams is an album featuring members of the Manson Family recorded in 1970, with all songs written by Charles Manson, and first released in 1997. Manson himself does not perform on the album; most of the male vocals are sung by Steve "Clem" Grogan. Other members appearing on the album are Sandra Good, Catherine "Gypsy" Share, Catherine "Cappy" Gillies, Nancy "Brenda" Pitman, and Ruth Ann "Ouisch" Moorehouse.

The album was released in 1997 by both Transparency Records and Aoroa Records simultaneously. The first disc contains a remaster of the limited-release white vinyl record The Manson Family Sings the Songs of Charles Manson. The second disc contains previously unreleased material and alternate takes.

== Production ==
The Manson Family gathered together in late 1969, including Bruce Davis (then wanted by the FBI), in the Spahn Ranch saloon, to record music for Robert Hendrickson's Manson film. This was the beginning of the Family Jams, though the earliest tapes remained buried in a vault. Audio was recorded as the murder trial was ongoing, with the song "Get on Home" containing the eerie line referring to the killers carving crosses into their foreheads: "When you see the children with x's on their head, if you dare to look at them, soon you will be dead."

== Track listing ==
All songs written by Charles Manson.

=== Disc one ===
1. "Ra-Hide Away!"
2. "Love's Death"
3. "Die to Be One"
4. "No Wrong-Come Along"
5. "Get on Home"
6. "Is There No One in Your World But You?"
7. "First They Made Me Sleep in the Closet/I'm Scratchin' Peace Symbols on Your Tombstone"
8. "Give Your Love (To Be Free)"
9. "I'll Never Say Never to Always"
10. "Look at Your Love"
11. "If I Had a Million Dollars"
12. "Goin' to the Church House"

=== Disc two ===
1. "A Gamblin' Man Come From Natchez"
2. "Ra-Hide Away"
3. "Die to Be One"
4. "The Fires Are Burning"
5. "Give Your Love (To Be Free)"
6. "The Young Will Overcome"
7. "Going to the Church House"
8. "Love's Death"
9. "I'll Never Say Never to Always"
10. "Die to Be One"
11. "Look at Your Love"
12. "I Can't Remember When"
13. "Going to the Church House"
14. "I Can't Remember When (Alternate)"
15. "Give Your Love to Be Free"
16. "London Bridge Is Falling Down"

== Influence ==
The British Doom Metal band Uncle Acid & the Deadbeats recorded a version of "Get on Home" to use as a b-side for the single release "Mind Crawler" from their 2013 album Mind Control.
