= Phil Kaufman (producer) =

American music producer and manager

- Born: Philip C. Kaufman; April 26, 1935 (age 91); Oceanside, New York, U.S.
- Genres: Country; rock; soul; R&B; blues
- Occupations: Record producer, tour manager, author

Philip C. Kaufman (born April 26, 1935) is an American record producer, tour manager, and author. He has been referred to as one of the most infamous tour managers in music history. Kaufman worked with Gram Parsons, The Rolling Stones, Emmylou Harris, Joe Cocker, Frank Zappa, Hank Williams III and Etta James, among others.

== Early life ==
Kaufman was born in Oceanside, New York. His father had been involved with show business as his grandfather had done, which involved vaudeville and big band. Kaufman joined the Air Force in 1952 and served for four years, which included time in the Korean War with the 37th Bomb Squadron. Kaufman had previously acted in Hollywood, with bit parts in Spartacus, Riot in Juvenile Prison, and Pork Chop Hill, among others, before a felony marijuana smuggling conviction in the mid-1960s. He left Terminal Island Prison in 1968.

== Managing career ==
After getting out of prison, he was offered a job driving for Mick Jagger and Marianne Faithfull, who were in Los Angeles at the time for the mixing of Beggars Banquet.

Kaufman's first musical role was as the driver and assistant to The Rolling Stones during the recording of Beggar's Banquet, referred to by Mick Jagger as his "executive nanny".

Through Keith Richards, Kaufman met Gram Parsons, and agreed to tour manage his group The Flying Burrito Brothers, although he had no prior tour managing experience. Kaufman also served as tour manager for Parsons' post-Flying Burrito Brothers group, Gram Parsons and the Fallen Angels. One of Kaufman's tasks was to help Parsons stay away from drugs, and to limit his alcohol intake. Parsons even stayed at Kaufman's house when his relationship with his wife deteriorated. In July 1973, Parsons expressed his final wish to Kaufman: to be cremated and buried at Joshua Tree National Monument.

On September 19, 1973, Parsons died of an overdose of morphine and alcohol. Though Parsons' stepfather Bob wanted to bury him in New Orleans in a private ceremony, Kaufman and Parsons’ assistant Michael Martin stole Parsons' body from Los Angeles International Airport and drove it to the Cap Rock section of Joshua Tree National Park. Kaufman poured gallons of gasoline on the casket and threw a lit match, which resulted in a fireball. Parsons' partially-cremated remains were buried in New Orleans, while Kaufman and Martin were each given thirty-day suspended jail sentences, fined $300 each for misdemeanor theft and charged $708 for funeral home expenses. The theft was later chronicled in the film Grand Theft Parsons with Johnny Knoxville playing Kaufman. Kaufman once said that "Dying was a great career move for Gram."

The song "Why Does It Hurt When I Pee?" from Frank Zappa's album Joe's Garage tells the story of Kaufman's "urination problems".

== Charles Manson ==
Kaufman met Charles Manson while they were inmates in Terminal Island Prison. According to Kaufman, a guard taunted Manson that he would never get out; Manson calmly responded by looking up from his guitar and saying, "Get out of where?" Manson aspired to be a successful singer–songwriter and Kaufman found him to be good company. He thought Manson was a bad guitar player, but capable enough as a singer and songwriter to have a chance of getting a record contract. Before Manson's release Kaufman gave him the name of a friend in the film industry, producer Gary Stromberg at Universal Studios. Kaufman advised Manson to wait a few months after he was released to acclimatize to the outside world, and work on his songs, before contacting Stromberg. Manson promised to take the advice.

Months after his release, Manson went to see Stromberg with four female devotees. On the recommendation from Kaufman, the producer authorized a studio recording session. Instead of having been prepared as Kaufman suggested, Manson was unfocused and amateurish, making the recording a disappointment. Kaufman was released the next year, and would spend time living with the Manson Family. According to Kaufman, he has "had sex with more murderers than anyone else in show business." Kaufman later left "the Family", claiming it was because he was "too smart".

Manson Family murder victims Leno and Rosemary LaBianca's home was next door to a house where Kaufman once lived. Members of the Manson Family had allegedly attended a party there with Kaufman when still friendly with him.

Kaufman would later produce and release Manson's album at the height of his notoriety, but found that he could not get anyone to stock Lie: The Love and Terror Cult.

== Personal life ==
He authored the book Road Mangler Deluxe, an autobiography about his experiences in the music business. As of 2020, Kaufman resides with Miss Jan in East Nashville, Tennessee.
