= Bluebirds over the Mountain =

1968 single by The Beach Boys

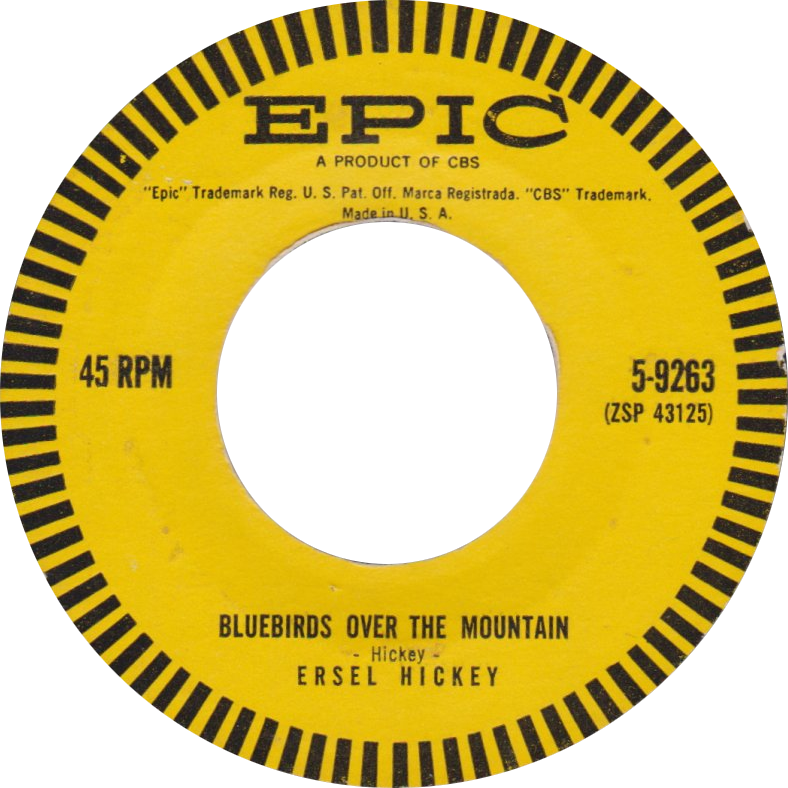
US single of Hickey's original recording

"Bluebirds over the Mountain" is a song written and recorded in 1958 by Ersel Hickey, later covered by artists such as The Beach Boys, Ritchie Valens and Robert Plant. Hickey's original recording of the song peaked at No. 75 on the Billboard Top 100 Sides on the week ending May 10, 1958, and No. 39 on the Cash Box chart. In Canada it reached No. 8. Ritchie Valens' cover version was released on his eponymous 1959 album. A 1962 recording by The Echoes hit No. 112 on Billboard's Bubbling Under Hot 100 Singles survey and was a top 20 hit on Chicago's WLS. A 1965 version by Ronnie Hawkins and the Hawks reached No. 8 in Canada.

== The Beach Boys version ==
"Bluebirds over the Mountain"

Single by the Beach Boys

from the album 20/20
- B-side: "Never Learn Not to Love"
- Released: November 29, 1968 (UK); December 2, 1968 (US)
- Recorded: September 29, 1967; early October-November 14, 1968
- Genre: Pop rock
- Length: 2:51
- Label: Capitol
- Songwriter: Ersel Hickey
- Producers: Bruce Johnston; Carl Wilson

The Beach Boys singles chronology
| "Do It Again" (1968) | "Bluebirds over the Mountain" (1968) | "I Can Hear Music" (1969) |

"Bluebirds over the Mountain" was covered by the Beach Boys and released as a single under the Capitol Records label on November 29, 1968, in the United Kingdom (acquired and published by Northern Songs) and December 2, 1968, in the United States with the B-side "Never Learn Not to Love". The song features Mike Love on lead vocals and the band's touring musician Ed Carter on lead guitar.

The single peaked at No. 61 on the Billboard chart and No. 56 on the Cashbox sales chart. It reached No. 53 in Canada. It also peaked at No. 33 on the UK Singles Chart on the week ending January 8, 1969. In the Netherlands, it peaked at No. 9 each on the Dutch Top 40 on the week ending January 18, 1969, and the Dutch Single Top 100 on the week ending January 25, 1969.

=== Personnel ===
Credits from John Brode, Will Crerar, Joshilyn Hoisington, Craig Slowinski, and 20/20 liner notes.

The Beach Boys

- Al Jardine – backing vocals, electric and acoustic guitars
- Bruce Johnston – lead (tag) and backing vocals, Hammond organ, producer
- Mike Love – lead and backing vocals
- Carl Wilson – backing vocals, electric and acoustic guitars, producer
- Dennis Wilson – vibraphone

Additional personnel

- Ed Carter – electric lead guitar
- Daryl Dragon – marimba
- Artie Kaplan – tenor saxophones
- Larry Knechtel – bass guitars
- Jim Gordon – drums
- Mike Kowalski – congas, additional percussion
- Van McCoy – string and horn arrangements
