= Never Learn Not to Love =

Single by the Beach Boys

from the album 20/20
- A-side: "Bluebirds over the Mountain"
- Released: December 2, 1968
- Recorded: September 11, 16–18, 1968
- Studio: Beach Boys, Los Angeles
- Length: 2:08 (single version); 2:31 (album version)
- Label: Capitol
- Songwriter: Dennis Wilson
- Producer: Dennis Wilson

The Beach Boys singles chronology
"Do It Again" (1968)	"Never Learn Not to Love" (1968)	"I Can Hear Music" (1969)

Licensed audio
- "Never Learn Not to Love (Remastered 2001)" on YouTube

"Never Learn Not to Love" is a song recorded by the American rock band the Beach Boys that was issued as the B-side to their "Bluebirds over the Mountain" single on December 2, 1968. Credited to Dennis Wilson, the song is an altered version of "Cease to Exist", written by the Manson Family cult leader Charles Manson. The blues-inspired song was written specifically for the Beach Boys, with Manson's lyrics addressing personal tensions that he had witnessed between Dennis and his brothers Brian and Carl.

Manson attended but did not participate in the recording of "Never Learn Not to Love", held at the Beach Boys' private studio in September 1968. The group reworked the song considerably and expanded the arrangement to include backing vocals, piano, guitar, bass, drums, organ, and sleigh bells. Manson was unperturbed by the musical changes, but insisted that they had altered his lyrics. By Dennis' account, Manson had voluntarily exchanged his official writing credit for a sum of cash and a motorcycle. Conversely, band engineer Stephen Desper said that the group had omitted Manson's credit as retribution for his thievery.

In February 1969, an extended edit of "Never Learn Not to Love" was included on the Beach Boys' album 20/20. The band performed the song during an April 1969 appearance on The Mike Douglas Show. Alternate versions and session highlights from the song's recording were released on the 2018 compilation I Can Hear Music: The 20/20 Sessions. A 1968 recording of Manson performing "Cease to Exist" appeared on his first album, Lie: The Love and Terror Cult, released in March 1970.

== Background ==
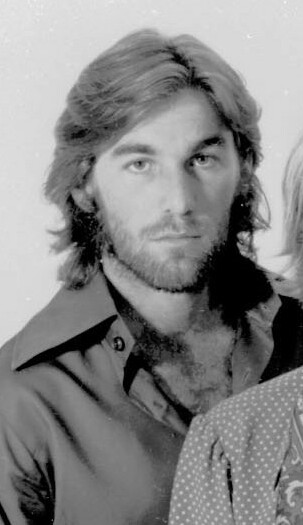
Dennis Wilson in 1968

In late spring 1968, Dennis Wilson struck a friendship with cult leader Charles Manson. At the time, Manson was an ex-convict seeking a career as a singer-songwriter, and Wilson, convinced of his talents, was interested in signing him as an artist on the band's Brother Records label. Music journalist Dan Caffrey commented that "it's understandable to see why Wilson felt a musical kinship with Manson", and while using Wilson's recent "Little Bird" and "Be Still" as examples, explained that Manson and Wilson shared a similar unprofessional approach and an interest in "fraying the edges of traditional forms".

Manson discussed and presented Wilson some of his self-penned material, and in exchange, Wilson paid for studio time to record songs performed by Manson. That summer, Manson booked a session at Brian Wilson's home studio for several tracks that were co-produced by Brian and Carl Wilson. Much of the recordings were not demos, but rather polished studio productions of songs that possibly included "Cease to Exist". These recordings remain unavailable to the public.

== Composition and authorship ==
According to Manson, he had penned "Cease to Exist" specifically for the Beach Boys to record. He explained, "[The Beach Boys] were fighting amongst themselves, so I wrote that song to bring them together. 'Submission is a gift, give it to your brother.' Dennis has true soul, but his brothers couldn’t accept it." Manson Family member Squeaky Fromme said of the song, "Charlie made up a song for Dennis, and we wrote down the words. Part of it was from a man to a woman, and part from a man to his brothers." Fromme added, "Dennis would later talk the Beach Boys into recording the song, but someone would talk him into changing the rhythm and words, and failing to even mention Charlie." Mike Love claimed that he was not aware of the song's author at the time, and assumed that Dennis had written it.

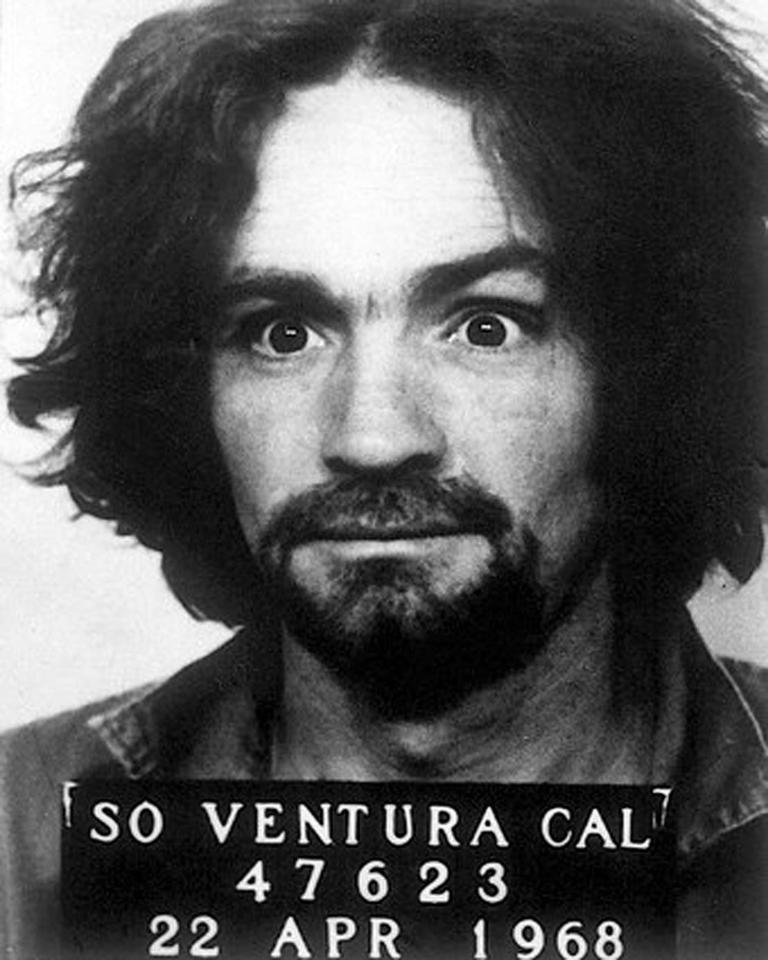
Manson (pictured 1968) forfeited his credit on the song for a sum of cash and a motorcycle

Manson was not given a label credit for the song. In exchange for the publishing rights to "Cease to Exist", he received a sum of cash and a BSA motorcycle which he later gave to Family member Paul Watkins. Asked in a 1971 interview as to why he did not credit Manson, Wilson answered, "He didn't want that. He wanted money instead. I gave him about a hundred thousand dollars' worth of stuff." Conversely, band engineer Stephen Desper stated that the decision to leave Manson uncredited was retribution for "the stuff of value that Manson ripped off from Dennis". Desper continued, "If Manson had been a decent person, the Beach Boy organization would have given him credit and treasure, as they did with other writers. But Manson was a thief and did not play by civil rules. By those rules, he was compensated as far as they were concerned."

"Never Learn Not to Love"
Excerpt of the opening verse.

The band reworked the song's bluesy structure, adding vocal harmonies and another bridge. According to Desper, "Manson only had a song with basic chords on the guitar and a melody lead line. It was the 'Boys who took that basic concept and turned it into a real commercial tune. ... Dennis took Manson's original concept and made something of it-- something Manson could never have done." Al Jardine recalled of Dennis and Manson: "it was just irritating 'cause they were always around and it was 'Charlie this, Charlie that.' And then he had this little thing that he and Charlie worked out. It was just a melody, a melody in 'Never Learn Not To Love.' Not the melody, but there was a mantra behind that. Then Dennis wanted to put it in everything. I thought, 'Oh boy, this is getting to be too much.'" Conversely, Desper credited "all the added vocal arrangement throughout the entire song" to Brian and Carl Wilson.

The lyrics were partially altered (the opening line "Cease to exist" modified to "Cease to resist"), and the title was changed to "Never Learn Not to Love", much to Manson's indignation. Manson threatened Wilson with murder for changing the lyrics. Gregg Jakobson remembered, "Charlie always said, he just asked one thing, he said to me, 'I don’t care what you do with the music. Just don’t let anybody change any of the lyrics.' That was one of his big beefs with Dennis. Dennis had taken some of his songs and changed the lyrics around, which really infuriated him." After realizing Manson's growing erratic behavior, Wilson ended his friendship with him soon after.

== Recording ==
The Beach Boys recorded "Never Learn Not to Love" at their private studio on September 11 and 16–18, 1968. In December 1968, Wilson recorded cymbal sounds, titled "The Gong", that were later reversed and added to the beginning of the 20/20 version of "Never Learn Not to Love". Other parts of the session were dedicated to a spoken-word monologue that went unreleased until the 2018 compilation I Can Hear Music: The 20/20 Sessions. Desper said that "Manson was only in the studio one evening, by himself and his silent girls. He never conferred or worked in any way with the group."

== Release and reception ==
It's probably the strangest record The Beach Boys have ever made. It really is so odd, disjointed and confusing. I can only see it being a hit because they're here in person [on a tour].

— Reviewer Penny Valentine in Disc & Music Echo, 1968

"Never Learn Not to Love" was released as the B-side to "Bluebirds over the Mountain" on December 2, 1968. The A-side reached number 61 on the Billboard Hot 100 and number 33 on the UK Singles Chart. The single edit is shorter than the album version with no backward cymbal opening and an echoed ending reminiscent of Little G.T.O. In February 1969, the song was released as a track on 20/20. In his review of the album, Arthur Schmidt of Rolling Stone, wrote that "'Never Learn Not to Love' is a fine vocal, though the material itself is an uncertain mixture of pop and soul influences." On April 1, the group performed the song during their appearance on The Mike Douglas Show. The episode was broadcast on April 9.

In his retrospective assessment of the song, Richie Unterberger commented "Never Learn Not to Love" is far more notorious for its relation to Manson, not the music itself which he describes as "average". Colin Larkin, in The Encyclopedia of Popular Music, wrote the track "had the ironic distinction of putting Charles Manson in the charts". Journalist Nathan Jolly called the song "softer but still eerie", also noting how fans of the Beach Boys who listened to the song over the years "had no idea of the inherent evil of its actual composer".

== Lie: The Love and Terror Cult version ==
"Cease to Exist"
Excerpt from Manson's 1968 recording of "Cease to Exist", as released in 1970 for Lie: The Love and Terror Cult.

During Manson's trial for the murders of seven people, his debut album, Lie: The Love and Terror Cult, was released in March 1970. Consisting of 13 tracks recorded between 1967 and 1968, it included Manson's original arrangement of "Cease to Exist".

In an AllMusic review of Manson's album, his rendition of "Cease to Exist" was regarded by Theodor Grenier as "one of Manson's signature performances, and has justifiably invited comparison with Jim Croce and José Feliciano". Critic Michael Little considers Manson's version superior to the Beach Boys', having praise especially for Manson's vocals: "you expect a tattered, raw, and raggedy voice, with a touch of lunatic rage, but what you get is a smooth-voiced folk singer". He also wrote that Manson's raw, stripped-down take "gives the song an impressive lo-fi immediacy that is a million miles away from the Beach Boys' treatment".

== Personnel ==
Per Craig Slowinski.

The Beach Boys

- Al Jardine – backing vocals
- Bruce Johnston – backing vocals
- Mike Love – backing vocals
- Brian Wilson – backing vocals
- Carl Wilson – backing vocals, bass, guitar
- Dennis Wilson – lead and backing vocals, piano

Session musicians

- John Guerin – drums, percussion, sleigh bells
- Don Randi – piano, organ
- Lyle Ritz – upright bass

== Cover versions ==
- 1994: Sean MacReavy, Dumb Angel
- 2020: Psychic Ills, Never Learn Not to Love / Cease to Exist 7" single

== See also ==
External videos
- "The Gong (Session Highlights)"

- Charles Manson sessions with the Beach Boys
- "Look at Your Game, Girl"

== Bibliography ==
- Badman, Keith (2004). The Beach Boys. The Definitive Diary of America's Greatest Band: On Stage and in the Studio. Backbeat Books. ISBN 0-87930-818-4.
- Carlin, Peter Ames (2006). Catch a Wave: The Rise, Fall Redemption of the Beach Boys' Brian Wilson. Rodale Inc. ISBN 1-59486-320-2.
- Fromme, Lynette (2018). Reflexion (Kindle ed.). The Peasenhall Press.
- Love, Mike (2016). Good Vibrations: My Life as a Beach Boy. Penguin Publishing Group. p. 208. ISBN 978-0-698-40886-9.
- McKinney, Devin (2003). Magic Circles: The Beatles in Dream and History. Harvard University Press. ISBN 978-0-674-01202-8.
- Sanders, Ed (2002). The Family. Da Capo Press. ISBN 1-56025-396-7.
- Webb, Adam (2001). Dumb Angel: The Life & Music of Dennis Wilson. Creation Books. ISBN 978-1840680515.
