= One Mind =

Studio album by Charles Manson
- Released: April 7, 2005
- Genre: Spoken word
- Length: 75:01
- Label: Family Jams

Charles Manson chronology
The Family Jams (1997)	One Mind (2005)

One Mind is a 2005 album by Charles Manson. It is composed entirely of songs, poems and speeches composed and performed by Manson himself in his jail cell at San Quentin, recorded on a portable tape recorder. It is the final original material to be performed by Charles Manson before his death on November 19, 2017.

The album was re-released in April 2008 as a free digital download under a Creative Commons license. The album was re-released again in June 2014 independently by Manson's non-profit organization ATWA.

== Track listing ==
1. "I Can See You" – 1:20
2. "Angels Fear to Tread" – 2:40
3. "Riding on Your Fears" – 5:05
4. "I Don't Need Water Sprinklers in the Desert" – 6:47
5. "Your Magic Motion" – 3:24
6. "Whoever You Are" – 2:29
7. "The Black Pirate" – 5:10
8. "So We Go Again" – 6:10
9. "Self Is Eternal (What Our World Will Be)" – 8:07
10. "Sometimes It Works Just Right" – 1:43
11. "Sweet Words" – 12:53
12. "Interpretations" – 4:03
13. "If You Have No One" – 5:20
14. "I Keep on Wondering (Interrupted)" – 4:09
15. "1967" / "Mac Brother" – 3:55
16. "Venice, California" – 2:36
