= Rat Catching =

Book by Crispin Glover

Front cover art for Rat Catching (1999) written by Crispin Glover (left) and Studies in the Art of Rat-Catching (1896) by Henry C. Barkley (right)

Rat Catching (ISBN 0962299707) is a book by actor and filmmaker Crispin Glover. The book is a form of collage, reworked from Studies in the Art of Rat Catching by Henry C. Barkley, an 1896 book now in the public domain. Pictures from the book, as well as the book itself, were shown in the opening credits of the 2003 film Willard, starring Glover. The book forms a segment of Glover's live slideshow readings, performed during particular screenings of his self-produced films What Is It? and It Is Fine! Everything Is Fine..

== Overview ==
The original book, Studies in the Art of Rat Catching, was written partially as an informative guide about the practicalities and methods regarding vermin control during the late 19th century, apparently directed at students within the English public school system with the intention of educating those particular pupils. The Neglected Books Page argues that the book is, in fact, more than a non-fiction guide book, but also a collage containing satire aimed at the education and employment prospects of the upper class and a collection of quaint tales of life and adventures in that era's rural England.

Glover's modified version, Rat Catching, alters the original and its intended meaning into a somewhat fragmented collection of words and sentences by means of obfuscation of particular texts with ink and drawing, along with the inclusion of imagery from various other sources that, while retaining some of the original context, forms its own particular narrative resulting in either humorously surreal or utterly disturbing results.

== See also ==
- Appropriation
- Found object art
