= List of covers of Charles Manson songs =

This is a list of cover versions by notable music artists of songs written by songwriter and convicted murderer Charles Manson. The songs that Manson wrote were released on albums recorded by his followers.

Artist	Song	Release(s)
The Beach Boys	"Never Learn Not to Love"	20/20 (1969)
GG Allin	"Garbage Dump"	You Give Love a Bad Name (1987)
The Lemonheads	"Home Is Where You're Happy"	Creator (album) (1988)
Crispin Glover	"Never Say 'Never' to Always"	The Big Problem ≠ The Solution. The Solution = Let It Be (1989)
Guns N' Roses	"Look at Your Game, Girl"	"The Spaghetti Incident?" (1993)
Sonic Boom	"Mechanical Man"	"Mechanical Man" (1994)
Marilyn Manson	"Sick City"	(released via podcast, February 14, 2000)
