= Gilbert Ralston =

American screenwriter

- Born: Gilbert Alexander Ralston; January 5, 1912; Newcastle, Co.Down, Ireland
- Died: March 18, 1999 (aged 87); Mount Pleasant, South Carolina, United States
- Occupation: Screenwriter

Gilbert Alexander Ralston (January 5, 1912 – March 18, 1999) was a British-American screenwriter, journalist and author. He was a television producer in the 1950s and a screenwriter in the 1960s. He created the television series The Wild Wild West and wrote scripts for Star Trek, Gunsmoke, Ben Casey, I Spy, Hawaii Five-O and Naked City. He wrote the screenplay for the 1971 movie Willard, which was based on the 1968 novel Ratman's Notebooks written by Stephen Gilbert.

== Early life and career ==
Ralston was born in 1912 in Newcastle, County Down, Ireland

In the 1950s he worked as a television producer in the United States. In the 1960s, he worked as a television screenwriter, according to the IMDb website. Willard was nominated for an Edgar Allan Poe Award in 1972 for Best Motion Picture.

He died on March 18, 1999, in Mount Pleasant, South Carolina, of congestive heart failure.

== Television screenwriter ==
Ralston was a screenwriter for many of the top television shows in the United States in the 1960s. He wrote the script for the 1967 Star Trek episode "Who Mourns for Adonais?", which is a line from Adonais (1821), the elegiac poem by Percy Bysshe Shelley. He also wrote scripts for Ben Casey, Laredo, I Spy, The Big Valley, Gunsmoke, The Naked City, Combat, Hawaii Five-O and The Wild Wild West He also wrote short stories.

== The Wild Wild West ==
Ralston helped create the television series The Wild Wild West and wrote the pilot episode, "The Night of the Inferno". In 1997, at the age of 85, Ralston sued Warner Brothers over the upcoming motion picture based on the series (Wild Wild West was released in 1999). In a deposition, Ralston explained that, in 1964, he was approached by producer Michael Garrison, who '"said he had an idea for a series, good commercial idea, and wanted to know if I could glue the idea of a western hero and a James Bond type together in the same show."

Ralston said he then created the Civil War characters, the format, the story outline and nine drafts of the script that was the basis for the television series. It was his idea, for example, to have a secret agent named Jim West who would perform secret missions for U.S. President Ulysses S. Grant.

Ralston's experience brought to light a common Hollywood practice of the 1950s and 1960s, where television writers who helped create popular series allowed producers or studios to take credit for said series, thus depriving the writers of any royalties.

== Outcome of court case ==
Ralston died in 1999 before his lawsuit was settled. Warner Brothers ended up paying Ralston's family between $600,000 and $1.5 million.

== Filmography ==
=== Films ===
Year	Film	Credit	Notes
1968	Kona Coast	Written by	
1971	The Hunting Party	Written by	
1971	Willard	Screenplay by	based on the novel Ratman's Notebooks by Stephen Gilbert
1972	Ben	Written by	based on characters created by Stephen Gilbert
1976	Special Delivery	Written by	

=== Television ===
Year	TV series	Credit	Notes
1952–53	Your Jeweler's Showcase	Producer	28 episodes
1952–54	Cavalcade of America	Producer	14 episodes
1953	General Electric Theater	Producer	12 episodes
1955–57	Captain Gallant of the Foreign Legion	Producer, Executive Producer	37 episodes
1957	High Adventure with Lowell Thomas	Producer	
1961	Bus Stop	Writer	1 episode
1961–62	Naked City	Writer	7 episodes
1961–64	Ben Casey	Writer	16 episodes
1962	Route 66	Writer	1 episode
1962	Target: The Corruptors!	Writer	1 episode
1962–63	The Untouchables	Writer	2 episodes
1963	Alcoa Premiere	Writer	1 episode
1963	Wide Country	Writer	1 episode
1964	The Richard Boone Show	Writer	1 episode
1964	Suspense	Producer	1 episode
1965	Alfred Hitchcock Presents	Writer	1 episode
1965	Burke's Law	Writer	1 episode
1965	Gunsmoke	Writer	1 episode
1965	I Spy	Writer	2 episodes
1965	Mr. Novak	Writer	1 episode
1965	Slattery's People	Writer	1 episode
1965	The Wild Wild West	Writer	1 episode
1965	12 O'Clock High	Writer	1 episode
1966	Combat!	Writer	1 episode
1966	Laredo	Writer	1 episode
1966–67	The Big Valley	Writer	3 episodes
1967	Insight	Writer	1 episode
1967	Iron Horse	Writer	2 episodes
1967	Star Trek	Writer	1 episode
1967–68	Gentle Ben	Writer	5 episodes
1968	Land of the Giants	Writer	1 episode
1969	Hawaii Five-O	Writer	1 episode
1969	The Name of the Game	Writer	1 episode
1971	O'Hara, U.S. Treasury	Writer	2 episodes
1972	Nichols	Writer	1 episode
