= Caldeiro =

Caldeiro is a surname. Notable people with the surname include:

- Fernando Caldeiro (1958–2009), Argentine scientist and NASA astronaut
- Alex Caldiero (born 1949), American poet and scholar
