= Dave Checketts =

American businessman (born 1955)

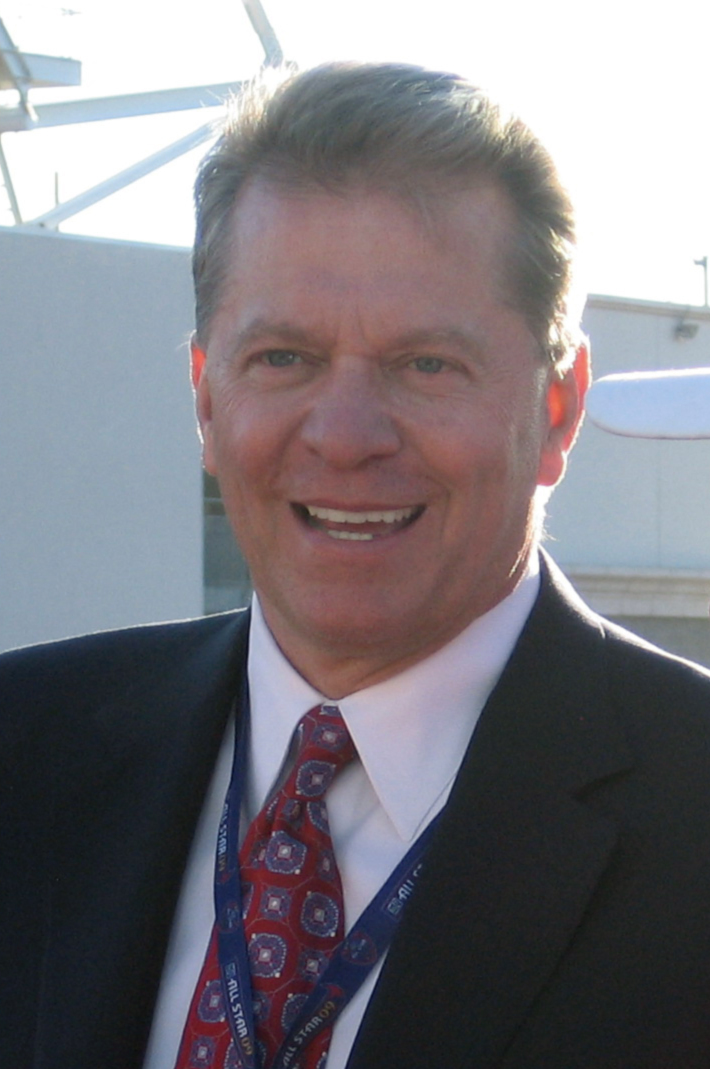
- Checketts in 2011
- Born: David Wayne Checketts; September 16, 1955 (age 71); Salt Lake City, Utah, U.S.
- Education: University of Utah (BS); Brigham Young University (MBA)
- Title: Managing partner, Checketts Partners Investment Management
- Spouse: Deborah Lynn Leishman (m. 1977)
- Children: 6
- Awards: Utah Sports Hall of Fame (2022)

David Wayne Checketts (born September 16, 1955) is an American businessman and sports executive. Checketts has served in c-suite roles or been an owner of the Utah Jazz, New York Knicks, New York Rangers, New York Liberty, Madison Square Garden (MSG), Legends Hospitality, and the St. Louis Blues. He also advised on Tom Gores' purchase of the Detroit Pistons and of Joe Tsai's purchase of the Brooklyn Nets.

== Early life and education ==
Checketts was born in Salt Lake City, Utah. Checketts graduated from Bountiful High School in 1973. Checketts graduated with a Bachelor of Science degree from the University of Utah in 1979, and, later, earned a Master of Business Administration degree from Brigham Young University in 1981.

== Career ==
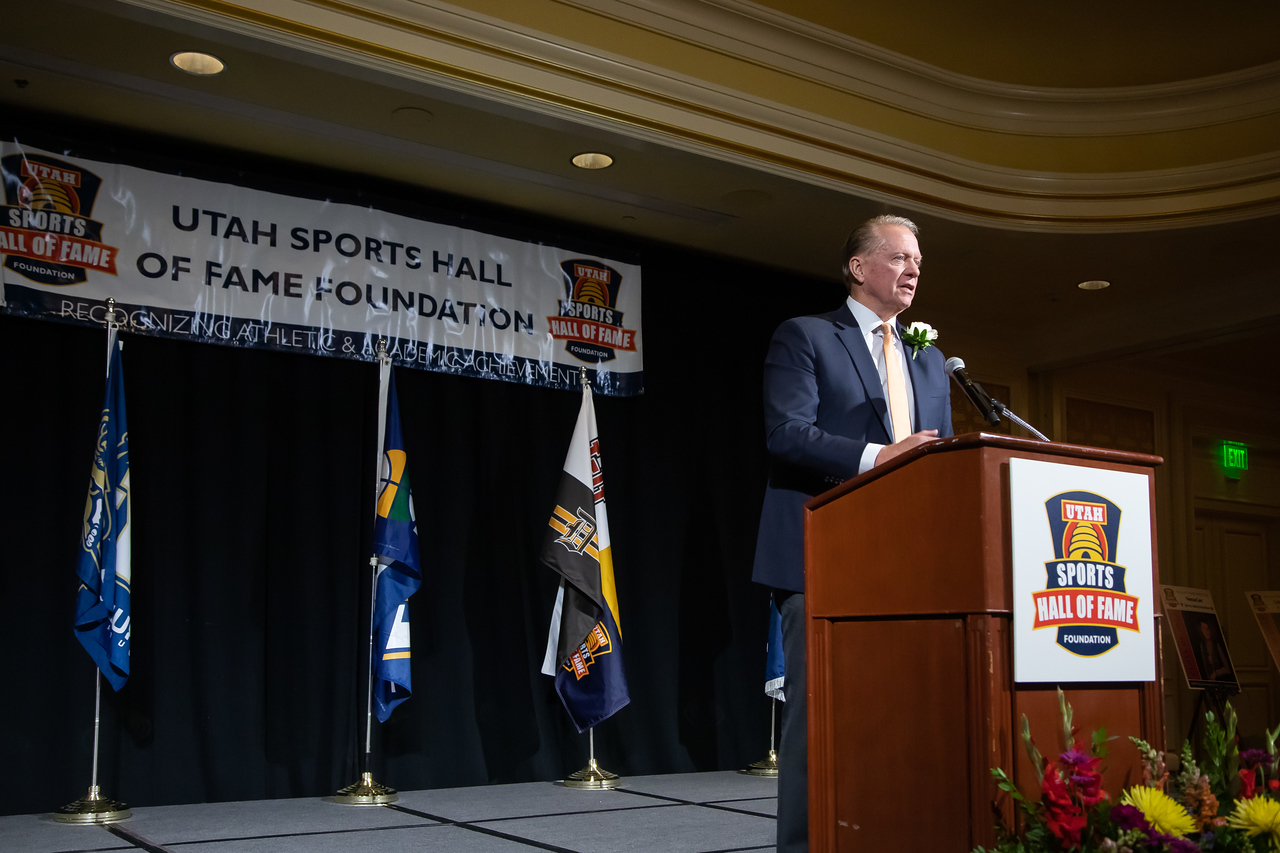
Checketts in 2011

Checketts started his career with the Boston-based consulting firm Bain & Company.

Then in 1983 at age 28, he became the president and general manager of the Utah Jazz, which made him the youngest chief executive in National Basketball Association (NBA) history. He then spent a year as the general manager of NBA International, where he worked to increase the league's presence around the world, including hosting the first regular season games played outside North America. The games took place in Tokyo in 1990.

In 1991, Checketts became president of the New York Knicks. He then advanced to president and CEO of MSG, which owns the New York Knicks, New York Rangers, New York Liberty, MSG Network, Radio City Music Hall, and other properties. Through MSG, Checketts led the 1997 acquisition and renovation of Radio City Music Hall. Checketts is also responsible for founding the New York Liberty in 1997 as one of the original Women's National Basketball Association (WNBA) franchises. Under Checketts' leadership, the New York Knicks went to the NBA Finals in both 1994 and 1999. The team made the playoffs ten straight seasons as well as earning a record 460 straight MSG sellouts. During his tenure, Forbes named the Knicks the most valuable franchise in the NBA and MSG was named Arena of the Year for six straight years.

In 2001, Checketts resigned as president and CEO of MSG and founded SCP Worldwide, a sports consulting and investment entity. Under SCP Worldwide, Checketts founded the Major League Soccer club Real Salt Lake (RSL) in 2005; Checketts is credited with building Rio Tinto Stadium and establishing it as the home of the club. Under his ownership, RSL won the 2009 MLS Championship. Through SCP Worldwide, in 2005 Checketts acquired the NHL's St. Louis Blues, which he owned until the 2019 season when the team won the Stanley Cup. The group sold the team after that.

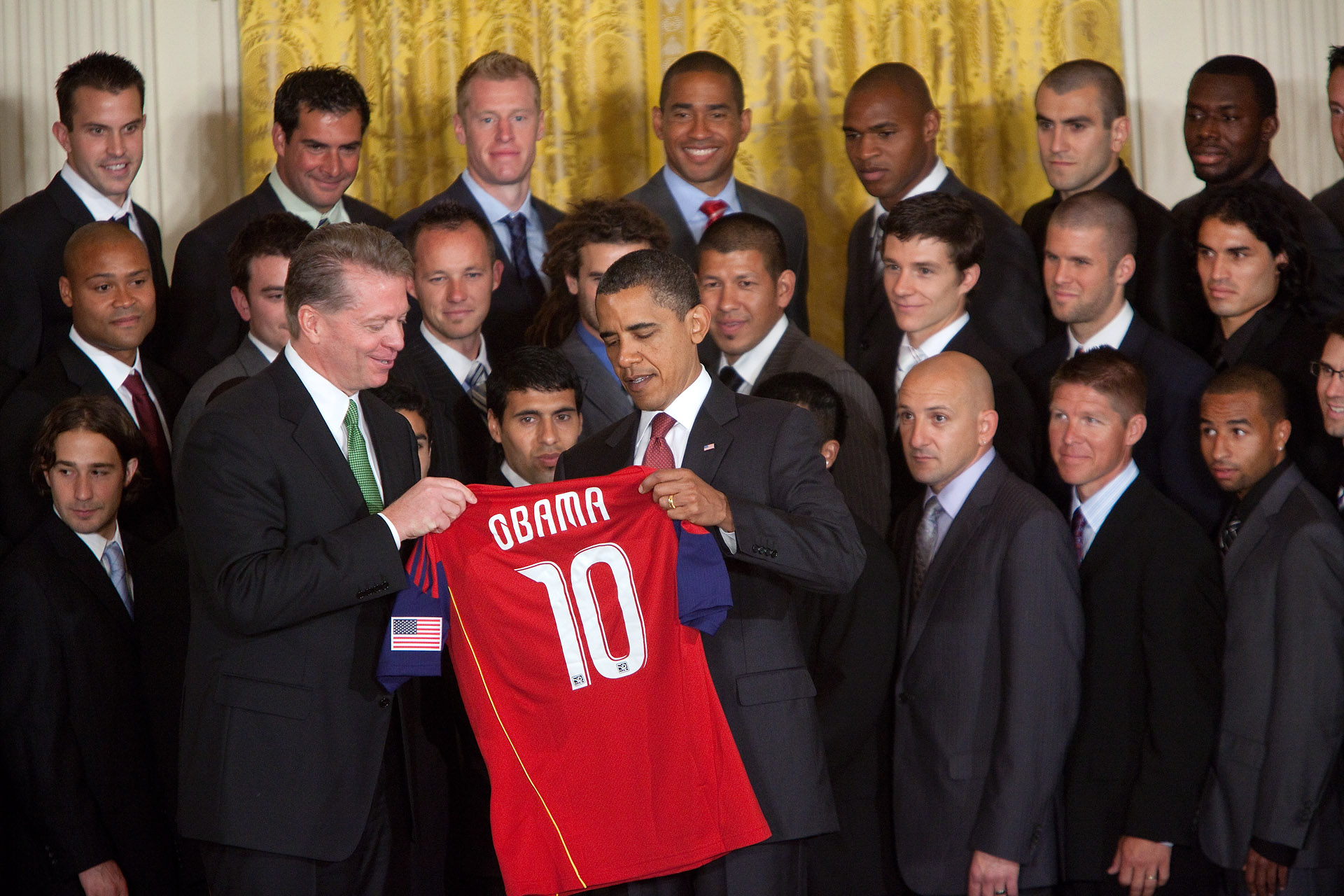
Checketts presenting a team jersey to the President Barack Obama

Checketts is the managing partner of Checketts Partners Investment Management (CPIM), a private equity firm he founded in 2011.

From 2011 to 2015, Checketts was chairman and CEO of Legends Hospitality, establishing the hospitality, merchandising and premium ticketing services provider as one of the industry's standard-bearers. CPIM purchased 20% equity in Legends, joining the Dallas Cowboys and New York Yankees as co-owners. Checketts secured contracts with venues such as Angel Stadium, Levi's Stadium, and Manchester City F.C.'s Etihad Stadium to build onto the core Yankees and ATT stadiums. Under Checketts' guidance, Legends designed, built, and now operates One World Observatory at the top of One World Trade Center in New York. The Observatory opened in May 2015 and is a must-visit for locals and tourists alike.

Checketts was an original founding board member of JetBlue and held this role until 2018.

In 2021, Checketts was named director of Burnley Football Club. With Burnley, Checketts doubles as an investor and one of the 4 directors on the board of directors.

In 2022, Checketts was named to the Utah Sports Hall of Fame.

As of 2025, Checketts is on the board of advisors for Ares Sports, Media and Entertainment alongside other notable board members like Mia Hamm, Grant Hill, and John Skipper. In the same year, Checketts was added on the board of trustees for Paley Center for Media in New York City. Other trustees include Rob Manfred, David Brothers, Gary Bettman, and more.

In April 2025, Checketts partnered with The Cynosure Group to launch a $1.2 billion private equity fund, Cynosure | Checketts Sports Capital Fund I, aimed at investing in high-potential assets across the global sports industry.

== Personal life ==
Checketts is a member of the Church of Jesus Christ of Latter-day Saints (LDS Church). In 2007, Checketts was called as president of the church's Yorktown New York Stake, succeeding Gary Crittenden. Checketts was featured in the book The Mormon Way of Doing Business by Jeff Benedict. In July 2018, Checketts began a three-year term of service as president of the LDS Church's England London Mission. During Checketts' mission over 700 missionaries from 54 countries worked together to create open-ended friendship centers. The centers helped refugees from other countries to find jobs and homes while learning English and getting settled in England. The mission coincided with the COVID-19 pandemic but continued to operate uninterrupted.

Checketts served as chairman of the Advisory Board of the Clinical Neurosciences Center at the University of Utah Hospital from 2010 to 2018.

Checketts and his wife, Deborah Lynn Leishman, are the parents of six children.

Their son, Spencer, worked as a Radio Host on "The Big Show" on 1280 KZNS (AM). He was also an anchor of Gameday Coverage of Utah Jazz for 1280/97.5 The Zone, NBA Analyst for KJZZ-TV and Root Sports Utah.

Two other sons, Nate and Ben, along with son-in-law, Carras Holmstead, founded an apparel company called Rhone Apparel in 2014. Checketts later led two investment rounds, the first in 2022 to buy out the private equity firm L Catterton. The Checketts family now controls the business.

Their daughter, Lily Checketts Shimbashi, is founder of Sports-ish, a sports and media company. She was honored at the Sports Business Journal's 2025 World of Congress where she was a featured speaker.

== Awards and honors ==
Checketts was honored as a Sports Business Journal "Champion" in 2025.
