= Scammerhead =

- Directed by: Dan Zukovic
- Screenplay by: Dan Zukovic
- Produced by: Jeremy Dyson; Brendan Keown
- Starring: Alex Rocco; Bruce Glover; Dan Zukovic
- Cinematography: Jeremy Dyson
- Edited by: Tim Chui
- Music by: Henrik Åström
- Release dates: August 29, 2014 (Montréal World Film Festival); April 3, 2015
- Running time: 108 minutes
- Country: Canada
- Language: English

Scammerhead is a 2014 Canadian comedy film directed by Dan Zukovic, in which a scam-artist attempts to successfully execute his most elaborate scam to date. The film stars Alex Rocco, Bruce Glover and Dan Zukovic.

== Cast ==
- Alex Rocco as Ben Sarnus
- Bruce Glover as Wyndham Bawtree
- Dan Zukovic as Silas Breece
- Chris Humphreys as Scrope Jelliver
- Johannah Newmarch as Miss Iceland / Miss Ireland
- Duane Whitaker as Dongren
- Shannon Wilcox as Imby Sarnus
- Alex Zahara as Ian Fragmont
- Garry Chalk as Beldon Fenisher
- C. Ernst Harth as Bruno Tornst
- Kurt Max Runte as Franz Exelmans
- Rick Askew as McCraster
- Kasey Ryne Mazak as Turra

== Production ==
A film noir with dark comic elements, Scammerhead was shot over seven years in numerous international locations, including New York City, Chicago, Vancouver, Las Vegas, Los Angeles, Berlin, Tokyo, Havana, London, Rome, Paris, Mexico City, Washington DC, New Orleans, Cleveland, Toronto, Liverpool, Memphis, Dallas, Atlanta, Elba Island and Alcatraz Island. It features one of the final performances by the well-known character actor Alex Rocco.

== Awards and honours ==
Year	Festival	Category	Award	Recipient(s)	Result	Ref.
2014	Montréal World Film Festival	N/A	Grand Prix des Amériques	Dan Zukovic	Nominated	
2015	Berkeley Video & Film Grand Festival Award	Grand Festival Award	Best Feature	Dan Zukovic	Won	
2015	Berkeley Video & Film Grand Festival Award	Grand Festival Award	Best Song Ever Award	Dan Zukovic (For the song "Maraschino Moon")	Won	
2015	Trenton Film Festival	TFF Award	Best Narrative Feature	Dan Zukovic (director) / Jeremy Dyson (producer) / Brendan Keown (producer) / Mitch Mayer (producer) / David Barnett (executive producer)	Won	
2015	Orlando Film Festival	N/A	Best Performance	Dan Zukovic	Nominated	
2016	Cinema World Fest Awards	Award of Excellence	Cinematography - Narrative Feature	Jeremy Dyson	Won	
2016	Cinema World Fest Awards	Cinema World Fest Award	Best in Show - Narrative Feature	Dan Zukovic (director) / Brendan Keown (producer) / Jeremy Dyson (producer) / Mitch Mayer (producer) / David Barnett (executive producer) / Third Tribe Productions Inc.	Won	
2016	Cinema World Fest Awards	Cinema World Fest Award	Award of Recognition, Acting	Chris Humphreys / Third Tribe Productions Inc.	Won	
2016	Hudson Valley International Film Festival	Festival Award	Best Actor in a Feature Film	Alex Rocco	Won	
2016	Hudson Valley International Film Festival	Festival Award	Best Director in a Feature Film	Dan Zukovic	Nominated	
2016	Marietta International Film Festival	Jury Award	Best Original Soundtrack	N/A	Nominated	
2016	Marietta International Film Festival	Jury Award	Best Wardrobe	N/A	Nominated	
2016	Great Lakes Film Festival	N/A	Best Comedy	Dan Zukovic (director) / Jeremy Dyson (producer) / Brendan Keown (producer) / Mitch Mayer (producer) / David Barnett (executive producer)	Nominated	
2017	Riverside International Film Festival	Jury Award	Best Cinematography	Jeremy Dyson / Third Tribe Productions Inc.	Won	
