= No! You're Wrong. or: Spooky Action at a Distance =

2025 film by Crispin Glover

No! YOU'RE WRONG. or: Spooky Action at a Distance
- Theatrical release poster
- Directed by: Crispin Hellion Glover
- Written by: Crispin Hellion Glover; Bruce Glover; Mike Pallagi
- Produced by: Crispin Hellion Glover
- Starring: Bruce Glover; Crispin Glover
- Cinematography: Kai Miedendorp
- Edited by: Crispin Hellion Glover
- Music by: Charlotte Kemp Muhl
- Production company: Volcanic Eruptions
- Distributed by: Volcanic Eruptions
- Release date: October 2, 2025 (Museum of Modern Art)
- Running time: 85 minutes
- Countries: Czech Republic; United States
- Language: English

No! YOU'RE WRONG. or: Spooky Action at a Distance is a 2025 American film written, edited, produced and directed by Crispin Glover and starring Glover and his father, Bruce Glover, who also co-wrote the screenplay.

== Synopsis ==
The Muldoon family's wealth and power fuel a cycle of obsession and strife, with father and son locked in a battle for control at its core.

== Cast ==
- Bruce Glover as Apollo Muldoon (1888) / Brutus Muldoon (1918) / Chronos Muldoon (1948)
- Crispin Glover as Brutus Muldoon (1888) / Chronos Muldoon (1918) / Damocles Muldoon (1948)
- Małgosia Bela as Violet
- Caitin Stickels as Athena Muldoon
- Mika Mae Jones as Eve
- Kristina Coolish as Belladonna Muldoon
- Kansas Bowling as Mary
- Elena Vladi as Demeter Muldoon
- Sean Lennon as Dream Toddler (voice)

== Production ==
Glover started developing the screenplay in 2007, as a project for him and his father, actor Bruce Glover, to act in together. Production of the film started in 2013 and originally wrapped in 2015, before Glover shot additional production segments yearly thereafter, wrapping principal photography in 2018. The film was primarily shot on sets constructed on shooting stages within the former horse stables on his property in the Czech Republic.

It was the first of Glover's films to be shot on 35mm film stock, having previously only shot his films on 16mm film. To create an aesthetic comparable to films of the silent era, a hand-cranked camera previously owned by Karel Zeman was used for the segments of the film set in 1868 and 1888.

== Release ==
The film premiered at the Museum of Modern Art on October 2, 2025. Like his two previous films, Glover tours with the film accompanied with his live show, a question-and-answer session, and a meet-and-greet/book signing.
