= The Beaver Trilogy =

2001 film by Trent Harris

- Directed by: Trent Harris
- Written by: Trent Harris
- Starring: Richard LaVon Griffiths; Sean Penn; Crispin Glover; Elizabeth Daily
- Release date: 2001
- Running time: 83 minutes
- Country: United States
- Language: English

The Beaver Trilogy (2001) is a documentary film directed by Trent Harris, featuring Richard LaVon Griffiths (also known as "The Beaver Kid" and "Groovin' Gary"), Sean Penn, Crispin Glover and co-starring Courtney Gains and Elizabeth Daily.

== Description ==
The Beaver Trilogy combines three separate vignettes that were filmed at different times, in 1979, 1981, and 1984. The first, titled The Beaver Kid, is a short documentary about the exploits of "Groovin' Gary", a performer that filmmaker Harris happened upon while filming for a Salt Lake City, Utah news station. Harris was in the parking lot of his workplace, testing out a color video video camera that the station had just acquired, when he stumbled upon Gary taking photographs of their news helicopter. Gary immediately launched into a number of celebrity impressions, including John Wayne and Sylvester Stallone.

Several weeks after they first met, Harris traveled to the small town of Beaver, Utah and filmed Gary, an Olivia Newton-John obsessive, as he staged a talent show that featured Gary dressed in full drag singing the Newton-John song "Please Don't Keep Me Waiting". Gary refers to his onstage alter-ego as "Olivia Newton-Don".

The second installment, titled The Beaver Kid 2 features Sean Penn as "Groovin' Larry" Huff in a dramatic interpretation of the original documentary. It incorporated some scenes from the original documentary. The Beaver Kid 2 was shot on a budget of $100.

The trilogy is completed with The Orkly Kid, in which Crispin Glover reprises Penn's role, this time referring to his onstage persona as "Olivia Neutron Bomb". The Orkly Kid was shot in color film, is considerably longer in length and more professional-looking than the first two acts, and also features a number of new supporting characters and plot twists.

== Availability ==
The filmmaker, Trent Harris, sells The Beaver Trilogy on DVD from his web store. As of 2007, the Salt Lake Film Society has a copy for rent which is available at the Tower Theatre. In August 2016 a documentary about it, titled Beaver Trilogy Part IV, was made available to stream on Netflix.

== Reception ==
=== Critical reception ===
In an interview with Robert K. Elder for his book The Best Film You've Never Seen, director Phil Lord highlights the merits of the trilogy: "To me, it felt like it was a film school education in 83 minutes. It’s a great treatise in story-telling and the different ways you can tell a story just with subtle changes."

== In other media ==
=== Radio ===
The film was also featured in the episode "Reruns" of the public radio show This American Life, which first aired December 6, 2002.

== Sequel ==
In 2015 a documentary about the film, called Beaver Trilogy Part IV, was released. It examined the relationship between the original film's star Richard Griffiths and its director Trent Harris. It is narrated by Bill Hader.

Richard LaVon Griffiths, the original Groovin' Gary, died of a heart attack at Intermountain Medical Center in Murray, Utah, on February 2, 2009, at age 50.
