= Trent Harris (director) =

American filmmaker (born 1952)

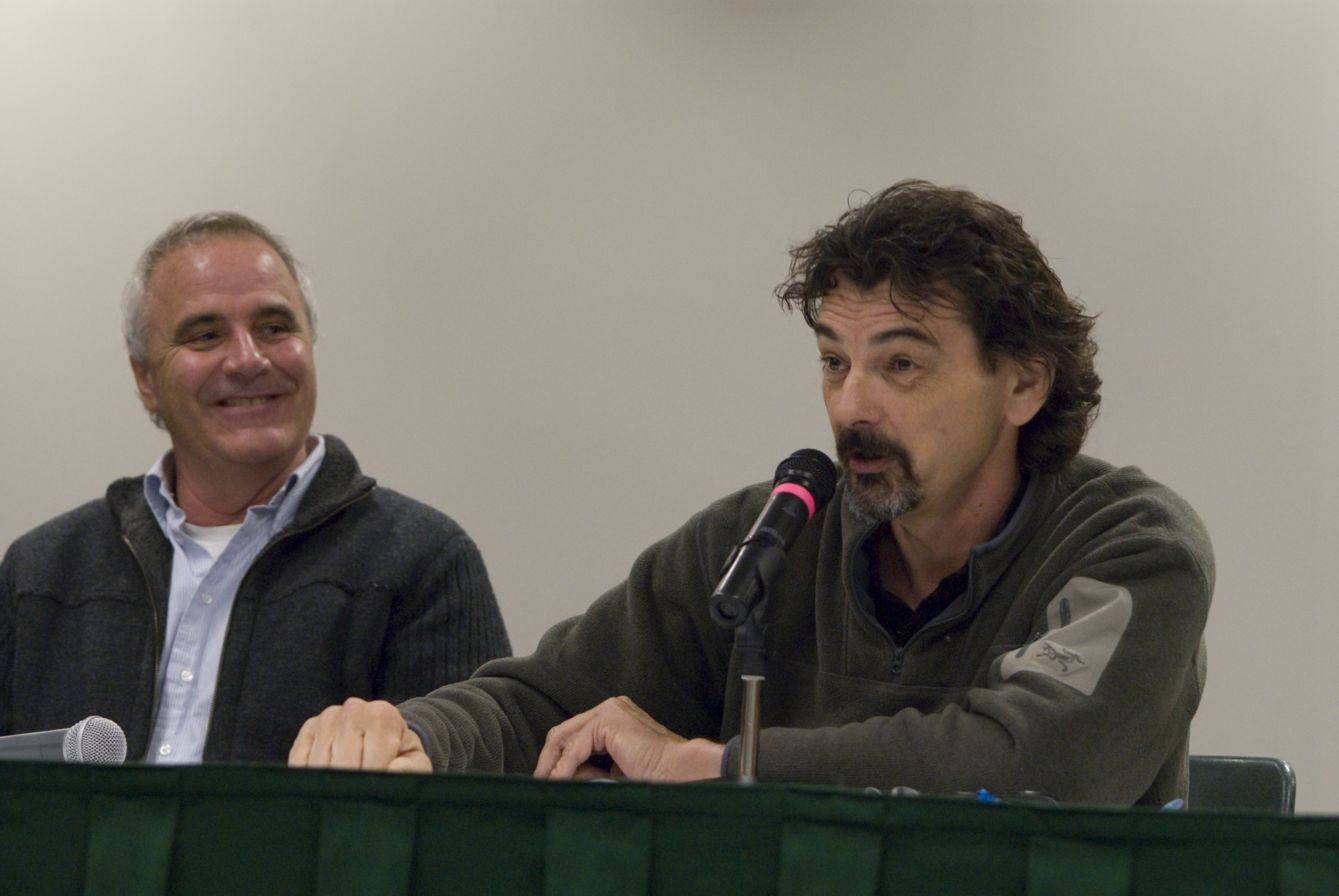
- Harris (left) with Mel Halbach, 2007
- Born: June 9, 1952 (age 74); St. Anthony, Idaho, U.S.
- Education: University of Utah, B.A., M.A.; American Film Institute
- Occupations: Screenwriter-director; author; film instructor
- Years active: 1978– present
- Notable work: Rubin & Ed (1991); Plan 10 from Outer Space (1995); Luna Mesa (2011); The Beaver Trilogy (2000)
- Style: Experimental (e.g.: Vérité; B-movie ironic; Underground iconoclastic; among others)
- Television: Salt Lake City broadcaster KUTV (writer-director of documentary shorts "Atomic Television," 1978–1981)
- Awards: 2001 Independent/Experimental Film and Video Award; B-Movie Underground & Trash Film Festival's Groundbreakers Lifetime Achievement Award, 2014
- Website: echocave.net

Trent Harris (born June 9, 1952) is an American filmmaker based in Salt Lake City, Utah.

Harris' films have been featured at various festivals and museums worldwide, including renowned venues like Sundance, the San Francisco Museum of Modern Art, the British Film Institute in London, the Edinburgh Film Festival, the Museum of Modern Art in Vienna Austria, Les Laboratories in Aubervilliers France, The Yerba Buena Center for the Arts in San Francisco, and the Pacific Film Archive in Berkeley.

== Career ==
Harris taught film and screenwriting classes at the University of Utah and worked as a documentarian and television journalist. He wrote and directed six feature films, many experimental movies, and more than one hundred documentaries for PBS, National Geographic, NBC, and others.

In 1991, he wrote and directed the comedy Rubin and Ed, in which Crispin Glover and Howard Hesseman wander the desert looking for a suitable place to bury a frozen cat.

In 2001 he released The Beaver Trilogy, a compilation film that documents his obsession with a man called Groovin' Gary (Richard Griffiths). The Beaver Trilogy features Sean Penn and Crispin Glover as Groovin' Gary in part two and part three, respectively. The Los Angeles Critics Association awarded Harris "Best Independent Experimental Film," was listed by the London Guardian as one of ”Fifty Lost Masterpieces,” and hit the "Top Ten" list of Art Forum Magazine. At AFI, Harris twice filmed fictionalized versions of Groovin’ Gary's story, renaming his protagonist Larry Huff.

In 2010 he appeared as a deranged astronaut in the film Memories of Overdevelopment.

In 2012, he finished the feature film, Luna Mesa which stars Richard Dutcher and Alex Caldiero.

In 2013, IndieWire proclaimed Harris "The Best Underground Filmmaker You Don’t Know — But Should."

In 2015, he was the subject of a documentary called Beaver Trilogy Part IV, narrated by Bill Hader, which examined his The Beaver Trilogy film and his relationship with its star, Richard Griffiths.

Harris' web series Echo People is a spin-off of Rubin and Ed.

Harris has written three books: The Wild Goose Chronicles, Fate Is A Hairy Rodent, and Mondo Utah.

== Filmmaking Style ==
Harris compares his style to two directors, Michelangelo Antonioni and Ed Wood.

== Filmography ==
=== Feature films ===
- Rubin and Ed (1991)
- Plan 10 from Outer Space (1994)
- The Beaver Trilogy (2000)
- The Cement Ball of Earth, Heaven, and Hell (2003)
- Delightful Water Universe (2008)
- The Wild Goose Chronicles (2009)
- Luna Mesa (2011)
- Welcome to the Rubber Room (2017)
- Echo People (2021)

=== Short films ===
- Subway (1975)
- The Beaver Kid (1979)
- The Beaver Kid 2 (1981)
- The Orkly Kid (1985)
- Burning Man (1997)

== Sources ==
- Astle, Randy (May 1, 2013). "On Being a Cult Filmmaker: An Interview with Trent Harris". Filmmaker.
