= Alex Caldiero =

American poet (1949–2026)

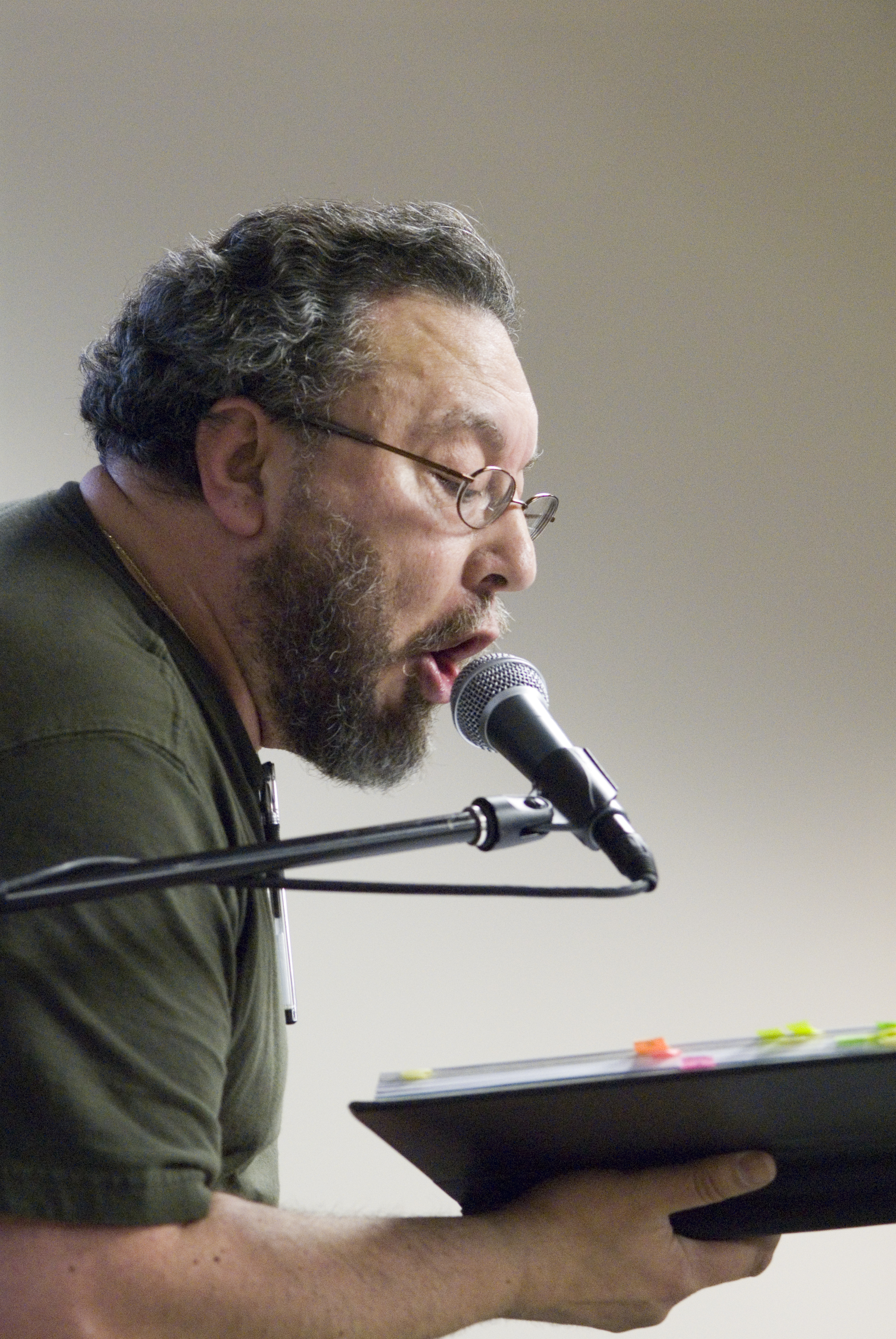
- Born: Alissandru Francesco Caldiero; 1949; Licodia Eubea, Sicily
- Died: 9 February 2026 (aged 76–77); Orem, Utah
- Occupations: Professor, Poet, Sonosopher
- Children: Isaac Caldiero, Sara Caldiero
- Website: https://thesonosopher.com/

Alissandru Francesco "Alex" Caldiero (1949 – 9 February 2026) was an Italian-born American poet, performer, and professor of the humanities. He described himself as a "sonosopher," a neologism combining sonos (sound) and sophia (wisdom) which has been described as a type of performative poiesis that "manifests as disruptive speech acts, calls upon various cultural figures and performance traditions to explore and practice language as a process of communion and relationship-making."

== Life and career ==
Caldiero was born in the ancient town of Licodia Eubea, near Catania, Sicily, in 1949. He immigrated to the United States at age nine and was raised in Manhattan and Brooklyn, New York. He attended Queens College in Flushing, New York, and was apprenticed to the sculptor Michael Lekakis and the poet-bard Ignazio Buttitta. Caldiero has traveled through Sicily, Sardinia, Turkey, and Greece collecting proverbs, tales, and folk instruments. He was co-founder of Arba Sicula, the society for the preservation of the Sicilian language and traditions, and is the recipient of grants from the National Endowment for the Arts, Utah Performing Arts Tour, and the Best Poetry Award from the Association for Mormon Letters.

Caldiero lived in Utah from 1980 with his wife and children, including Isaac Caldiero and Sara Caldiero, shortly after converting to Mormonism. His work has been reviewed by The Village Voice and The New York Times and he is included in A Dictionary of the Avant-Gardes.

Caldiero was a professor of the humanities at Utah Valley University and the universities only artist-in-residence until his death (after which the position was removed). Caldiero died on the 9th February 2026, after having suffered from a heart attack, at the age of 76.

== Publications & exhibitions ==
- Various Atmospheres: Poems (Signature Books, 1998)
- Poetry is Wanted Here! (Dream Garden Press, 2010)
- Lu Latti di La Matri (Poetry) https://www.cssss.org/libro_lu_latti_di_la_matri.htm (Centro Studi Storico Sociali Siciliani - CSSSS, 1980)
- sonosueno (EliK Press, 2013)
- Some Love: Poetry (Signature Books, 2015)
- Baggage: Alex Caldiero in Retrospect (Utah Museum of Contemporary Art Press, 2021)

Anthologies

- Text-Sound Texts, Richard Kostelanetz, ed., Morrow, New York, 1980. ISBN 0-688-03616-3 pp. 412–417

Exhibitions

- Performing the Book: Caldiero's "The Food that Fits the Hunger". Salt Lake Arts Center, Utah. 1995.
- After the Tree Had Fallen: Recent works and collaborations. Alex Caldiero & Frank McIntyre. Limited edition catalog. Marshall Studios.2003.

== Performances ==
Caldiero performed at the Utah Arts Festival, several times on National Public Radio on the Poetry Bus Tour in 2006, at The New School for Social Research, the Pritchard Art Gallery, the Salt Lake Art Center, Utah Valley University, the Kiva Koffeehouse in the Grand Staircase–Escalante National Monument, and on Brazilian TV.

His notable performance of Allen Ginsberg's "Howl" on the 50th anniversary its first reading drew a record poetry crowd at a local book store.

Caldiero later performed together with various members of Theta Naught, an ensemble that describes their music as "psychodelicious music". Caldiero intoned his poetry while the band played.

== Films and documentaries ==
- Plan 10 from Outer Space (1994, directed by Trent Harris)
- Chloes Blanket 1996, (directed by Lory Smith)
- This Divided State 2005, (directed by Steven Greenstreet)
- The Mormons Part I 2007 (PBS documentary)
- The Sonosopher: Alex Caldiero in Life...in Sound 2010, by Torben Bernhard and Travis Low)

== Audio/video ==
=== Videotapes ===
- Sandscycles, meditation video (soundtrack/performance). With choreography and Earth Spirit Process by Maida Rust Withers. Produced by Verabel Cluff, 1992.
- The Journey Two Steps Long, language performance works. Produced by Brandon Kiggins, University of Utah, 1993.
- Words: Exterior/Interior, language acts. Produced by Steve W. Olpin. 1999.

=== Audio tapes / CDs ===
- Dream Tracts, a transenvironmental performance. Audiotape. Produced by Scott Carrier, 1992.
- Ensphered, transenvironment1. Audiotape. Produced by Scott Carrier. 1993.
- Illegible Tattoos, words/voice/drum. CD. Produced and performed by Alex Caldiero. 1998.
- Sphota Probe. Sonosophical/text works. CD. Produced by Mike Collins. 1999.
- Pieces in Places: Transenvironmental performances. CD. 2002.
- From Sound Mind, acts of language. CD. 2003.
- Sound Weave, word-music album with music by Theta Naught. CD. Differential Records. 2006.
- Na Lacrima, audiofile
