= Rubin & Ed =

- VHS cover
- Directed by: Trent Harris
- Written by: Trent Harris
- Produced by: Paul Webster
- Starring: Crispin Glover; Howard Hesseman
- Cinematography: Bryan Duggan
- Edited by: Brent A. Schoenfeld
- Music by: Fred Myrow
- Production company: Working Title Films
- Distributed by: Rank Film Distributors
- Release dates: 1 August 1991 (WFF); 15 May 1992 (United States)
- Running time: 82 minutes
- Country: United Kingdom
- Language: English
- Budget: $1.25 million
- Box office: $15,675

Rubin & Ed is a 1991 British independent buddy comedy film written and directed by Trent Harris. It stars Crispin Glover and Howard Hesseman as an unlikely pairing on a road trip through the Utah desert.

== Plot ==
Rubin Farr is an eccentric, unsociable young man who lives in a motel run by his mother and mourns his cat, which is being stored in a refrigerator until he can find a proper spot to bury it. Ed Tuttle is a divorced, middle-aged yuppie who works for real estate pyramid schemer Mr. Busta as a recruiter for his $3,000 "seminars". As a condition of returning his stereo to him, Rubin's mother forces her son to go out and make at least one friend. Rubin befriends Ed and decides to go and bury his cat in the Utah desert. He and Ed take Ed's car, which is actually on loan from Mr. Busta. While Rubin sees in Ed the potential for the type of friend his mom wants him to make, Ed sees an opportunity to recruit Rubin for Busta's seminars. In the desert, the pair's car breaks down and Rubin and Ed have a disagreement about where the nearest town is located.

Ed gets attacked by ants and returns to the car, which he repairs and decides to drive back after learning that Busta has reported the car stolen. Rubin, meanwhile, knocks himself unconscious while exploring a cave and has a dream of being the "King of the Echo People". As king, Rubin owns the world's biggest platform shoes and enjoys an inner-tube float on a placid lake while his cat goes water-skiing behind him in a boat piloted by his dream girl. His fantasy is interrupted by Ed, who has returned to find him after a crisis of conscience.

Rubin and Ed drive to Busta's headquarters, where Rubin disrupt a seminar. Busta gives chase only to collide, literally, with police intent on arresting him for stealing his own car, leaving Rubin and Ed to wander down a dark alley and argue, as they have throughout the film, over which of them is the bigger failure.

== Cast ==
- Howard Hesseman as Ed Tuttle
- Crispin Glover as Rubin Farr
- Karen Black as Rula
- Michael Greene as Mr. Busta
- Brittney Lewis as Poster Girl
- Anna Louise Daniels as Rubin's Mom
- Ray Gordon as Barking Man
- Dorene Nielsen as Ed's Mom

== Production ==
Before Howard Hesseman was cast as Ed in the film, Peter Boyle was considered, but Boyle suffered a near-fatal stroke that left him completely speechless and immobile for nearly six months. Hesseman took the role after two weeks of filming..

The movie was filmed in Utah in Salt Lake City, Hanksville, Factory Butte and Goblin Valley State Park.

== Glover's appearance on Late Night ==
Crispin Glover appeared on Late Night with David Letterman in 1987 to promote the film River's Edge. During the interview, Glover wore platform shoes and a wig, behaved erratically, and nearly kicked David Letterman in the face, causing Letterman to walk off the set. After Rubin & Ed premiered four years later, some speculated that Glover appeared on the show in-character as Rubin Farr. Rubin Farr also appears in Glover's music videoclip for the song "Clowny Clown Clown" and is also cited as "Mr Farr".

== Release ==
Rubin & Ed received a limited theatrical release on 15 May 1992 in the United States, playing in 18 theaters.

On August 18, 2020, it received a Blu-ray release from Sony Pictures.

== Reception ==
TV Guide called it "a warm, funny and well-crafted celebration of eccentricity with terrific performances from Glover and Hesseman, who could easily be the perfect comedy duo for the post-modern age" and praised director Trent Harris for "[maintaining] an easy mood of lunacy throughout". The review added, "Many low-budget films strive to be genuinely offbeat with stories, characters and situations that just aren't ready for big-studio treatment. Perhaps because it doesn't strive, Rubin & Ed, a shaggy dog buddy-buddy comedy, singularly succeeds in being genuinely quirky fun."

In The Austin Chronicle, Sidney Moody noted the film "is considered to be the essential Glover performance by hard-core Glover aficionados. Yet, however much the film is centered on Glover, it manages to work as a mechanism for the expansion of his unique talents instead of contracting them into a one-man shtick." Moody concluded, "If you are up to making the search for this hard-to-find gem, it will be well worth your effort." Chris Hicks of the Deseret News gave a more mixed review, writing "Harris can be very eccentric — the dream sequence, with Rubin's cat resurrected on water skis, is a comic highlight — and he comes up with some funny, if quirky moments in the context of his lightweight screenplay. But the film as a whole is somewhat disappointing. It often drags, lacking the narrative drive necessary to hold it all together. And it's weighted down by a less-than-satisfactory ending."
