= Torben Bernhard =

American film director

- Born: March 5, 1983 (age 42); Kalamazoo, Michigan
- Occupation(s): film director, producer, cinematographer, rap artist
- Spouse: Marissa Bernhard
- Website: http://www.torbenbernhard.com/

Torben Bernhard (born March 5, 1983) is an American documentary filmmaker and rap artist originally from Kalamazoo, Michigan, and currently residing in Orem, Utah. Bernhard has written and directed documentary films and has additionally worked as a producer and cinematographer. He is part of the OHO Media film collective with his wife Marissa Bernhard and frequent collaborator Travis Low.

Bernhard’s films include the feature-length documentary on polyartist Alex Caldiero entitled “The Sonosopher: Alex Caldiero in Life...in Sound,” which was an official selection at the 2010 Cinequest Film Festival. He and his OHO Media cohorts created the documentary shorts Tarkio Balloon, Scavenger, and Boomtown (co-directed with Travis Low. These three shorts are among the five-part Lost and Found Series. The shorts were official selections at the Big Sky Documentary Film Festival over three successive years, beginning with Tarkio Balloon in 2011, Boomtown in 2012, and Scavenger in 2013.

Bernhard is a member of Kalamazoo, Michigan hip-hop group Mental Elastic Dynasty, which performed at Austin, Texas’ SXSW music festival in 2012.

== Filmography ==
- Wrestling with God: A Three-Way Conversation on Mormonism (2008)
- Tarkio Balloon (2010)
- The Sonosopher: Alex Caldiero in Life...in Sound (2010)
- Scavenger (2012)
- Boomtown (2012) (co-directed with Travis Low)
