= The Big Problem ≠ The Solution. The Solution = Let It Be =

Studio album by Crispin Glover
- Released: 1989
- Genre: Avant-garde
- Length: 42:47
- Label: Restless Records

Professional ratings
Review scores
Source	Rating
Allmusic	3/5 stars

The Big Problem ≠ The Solution. The Solution = Let It Be. is an album by Crispin Glover which was recorded by Barnes and Barnes. The liner notes state that if one discovers what "The Big Problem" is, then they can call (213) 464-5053 to tell Glover what they think it is. As of June 2007, the phone number has been disconnected.

== Track listing ==
1. "Overture" – 0:33
2. "Selected Readings from Rat Catching" – 3:51
3. "The New Clean Song" – 2:15
4. "Auto-Manipulator" – 4:08
5. "Clowny Clown Clown" – 2:55
6. "Getting Out of Bed" – 2:32
7. "These Boots Are Made for Walking" – 4:03
8. "The Daring Young Men on the Flying Trapeze" – 3:36
9. "Never Say "Never" to Always" – 0:54
10. "Selected Readings from Oak Mot-Part 1" – 6:40
11. "Selected Readings from Oak Mot-Part 2" – 2:02
12. "Selected Readings from Oak Mot-Part 3" – 3:21
13. "Selected Readings from Oak Mot-Part 4" – 6:19

== Promotion ==
A music video was made for "Clowny Clown Clown" and was directed by Glover. A portion of the video was shown during Glover's March 28, 1990 interview on The Late Show with David Letterman, during which the album was more generally discussed.

When Glover was interviewed by Howard Stern in the early 1990s, "The New Clean Song" was played to promote the album.
