= Willard (2003 film) =

- Theatrical release poster
- Directed by: Glen Morgan
- Written by: Glen Morgan
- Based on: Ratman's Notebooks by Stephen Gilbert and; Willard by Gilbert Ralston
- Produced by: James Wong; Glen Morgan
- Starring: Crispin Glover; R. Lee Ermey; Laura Elena Harring
- Cinematography: Robert McLachlan
- Edited by: James Coblentz
- Music by: Shirley Walker
- Production company: Hard Eight Pictures
- Distributed by: New Line Cinema
- Release date: March 14, 2003
- Running time: 100 minutes
- Country: United States
- Language: English
- Budget: $20 million
- Box office: $8.6 million

Willard is a 2003 American psychological horror film written and directed by Glen Morgan and starring Crispin Glover, R. Lee Ermey and Laura Elena Harring. It is loosely based on the novel Ratman's Notebooks by Stephen Gilbert, as well as on the novel's first film adaptation, Willard (1971), and its sequel, Ben (1972). It was not billed as a remake by the producers, who chose instead to present it as a reworking of the themes from the original with a stronger focus on suspense.

Willard was released theatrically by New Line Cinema on March 14, 2003, and received generally positive reviews from critics, who praised Glover's performance. However, the film underperformed financially, grossing $8.5 million worldwide against a $20 million budget.

== Plot ==
Social misfit Willard Stiles, who cares for his ill and fragile but verbally abusive mother Henrietta in a musty old mansion, is constantly humiliated and mercilessly taunted in front of his co-workers by his vicious and cruel boss, Frank Martin, who took over the Stiles family company after Willard's father Alfred died by suicide in 1995; Frank promised Stiles that Willard would have a job as long as she lived. After discovering and failing to exterminate a growing rat colony in the basement, Willard befriends and quickly becomes obsessed with a white rat he names Socrates, considering him his only real friend.

At work, Martin locks Willard in the elevator, though Willard's sympathetic co-worker Cathryn eventually releases him. That evening, he watches Socrates begin tearing up a newspaper, prompting him to train the now-expansive horde of rats, including Ben, a monstrously large rat (portrayed in the film by a Gambian pouched rat) who envies Willard's favoritism towards Socrates. After training the rats sufficiently, Willard takes them to Martin's home and orders them to chew up the tires on Martin's new Mercedes-Benz. While Willard initially rejects bringing along Ben with the other rats due to his size, the rat sneaks along anyway and chews a hole in the garage door to join the other rats in destroying all four tires of the Mercedes. A dog follows Willard in his hurried run from the house and he puts the dog in the bag before deciding to take it out after hearing it yelp when packed in with the rats. The next day at work, an on-time Willard gleefully watches Martin arrive late and tired. While Willard explains to the rats that they must move out, Henrietta overhears him, assuming he plans to get rid of her. Startled by noises from the basement, Willard finds her dead the next morning, having fallen down the basement stairs that allows the rats to come out from the basement, including a rebellious Ben. At the wake, Willard learns that Henrietta refinanced the family home to pay off Alfred's debts resulting in the house's payments falling behind and that the bank will likely foreclose upon the property.

In Henrietta's bedroom, Willard finds an envelope from the coroner's office containing the effects found on Alfred's body, including the still-bloody pocket knife he evidently committed suicide with. Distraught, Willard attempts suicide with the knife until Socrates stops him. Attempting to comfort Willard, Cathryn describes her own mother's death and gives him a pet cat, Scully, whose own mother helped Cathryn to grieve. Willard reluctantly takes Scully, with Socrates safely stowed in his pocket. In a scene set to the title song from the 1972 movie Ben, the rats (who have by now taken over the entire house) pursue and fatally overpower the cat.

Desperately lonely, Willard starts bringing Socrates to work with him. Despite a contract written by Alfred stipulating that he remain employed by the family company, Willard finds a note at his desk from Martin declaring that he is being fired. While Willard desperately pleads with Martin to let him keep his job, Martin's secretary, Barbara Leach, discovers Socrates in the supply room. Her screams alert Martin, who fatally bludgeons Socrates to death while Willard watches helplessly. Fed up with all the torment, Willard finally snaps and hatches a plan to avenge Socrates' death with Ben. Loading the numerous rats into a company van, he confronts Martin and orders them to swarm upon Martin and kill him.

At home, Willard kills the remaining colony before ratproofing his entire house. Exhausted after the night's events, he is finally awakened by the doorbell. Terrified by the shadows of two policemen, he remains standing in the hallway until the evening, seemingly feverish. Cathryn appears, informing Willard that Martin's body was found and that rumors had arisen that he was either murdered or eaten by animals. Coming face-to-face with Ben, Willard tries to leave the house before realizing that the leftover rats have chewed out his car tires. Accosted by the two policemen, Willard retreats into the house and frantically attempts to prevent the rats from entering. Trapping himself in the kitchen, Willard is confronted by Ben, whom he tries to kill with a rat trap.

Believing Willard is insane, and aghast at the rat infestation, the police leave to call Bellevue Hospital and the health department. When Cathryn tries to enter the house, they warn her against entering, asking whether she wants to be eaten alive. Horrified, she connects the rats to Martin's death and realizes Willard's complicity. Ben, even though severely injured, viciously attacks Willard as he tries to escape. The police officers and Cathryn look on as Willard, outlined in the upstairs window, kills Ben with his father's pocket knife.

The final scene reveals Willard in a psychiatric hospital, seemingly semi-catatonic and refusing to talk. A white rat appears in his cell, crawling into Willard's sleeve as Socrates used to. Believing that his friend has been reincarnated, Willard joyfully drops his semi-catatonic act and begins telling the rat his plans for an escape.

== Cast ==
- Crispin Glover as Willard Stiles, a lonely outcast who is constantly abused by his boss Frank Martin, whom he feels stole the manufacturing business built by his father, and his beloved mother. He befriends a colony of rats, especially a white rat named Socrates and a large rat named Ben, though the latter soon becomes an antagonist. When Socrates is killed by Martin, he uses his rats to get revenge.
- R. Lee Ermey as Frank Martin, the cruel and psychopathic CEO of Martin-Stiles Manufacturing. He constantly insults and humiliates Willard for arriving late to work, and seems set on firing Willard and seizing his house, but is eventually eaten alive by Willard's rats.
- Laura Elena Harring as Cathryn, one of Willard's co-workers, who sympathizes with him and comforts him after his mother's death. She quits her job in solidarity for the ill-treated Willard, although she later discovers his involvement in Martin's death.
- Jackie Burroughs as Henrietta Stiles, Willard's ill yet verbally abusive mother. Frail and eccentric, she berates her son for being single and feels that his life has been wasted. She is nevertheless anxious over her son, presumably related to the suicide of his father several years before.
- Kimberly Patton as Barbara Leach, Frank Martin's cynical secretary who is often rude and passive-aggressive to both Willard and Cathryn.
- William S. Taylor as Joseph Garter, a trustee of the Stiles estate who informs Willard of his dire financial situation after his mother's death.
- Ty Olsson as Officer Salmon, a policeman who tries to talk to Willard, presumably regarding Frank Martin's death. He asserts unambiguously that Willard is "nuts".
- Bruce Davison, who portrayed Willard in the original 1971 film, makes a non-acting cameo appearance as Willard's late father, Alfred Benjamin Stiles, in a portrait above the house's fireplace.

== Release ==
=== Box office ===
The film opened at number eight at the U.S. box office, grossing US$4,010,593. It fell to 13th the following week, and finished with $6,886,089 at the domestic box office and $1,660,577 at the foreign box office.

=== Critical reception ===
On Rotten Tomatoes, the film has an approval rating of 64% based on reviews from 126 critics. The consensus reads: "In this creepy story of a man and his rodents, Glover seems born to play the oddball title character". On Metacritic, it has a score of 61% based on reviews from 31 critics, indicating "generally favorable reviews". Audiences polled by CinemaScore gave the film an average grade of "D−" on an A+ to F scale.

Film critic Roger Ebert of The Chicago Sun-Times gave Willard 2.5 stars out of 4, praising Glover's performance as a highlight and saying the "new film looks better, moves faster and is more artistic than the original." However, Ebert also felt the rats were not frightening and Willard failed as a horror film.

== Awards ==
- Crispin Glover was nominated for Best Actor at the 2004 Saturn Awards.
- Robert McLachlan won the CSC award at the Canadian Society of Cinematographers Awards for Best Cinematography in a Theatrical Feature.
- The DVD release was nominated for a Golden Satellite award for Best DVD Extras at the 2004 Satellite Awards.
