= Ratman's Notebooks =

1968 short novel

- First edition dust jacket cover
- Author: Stephen Gilbert
- Language: English
- Published: 1968
- Publisher: Michael Joseph Ltd.
- Publication place: United Kingdom
- ISBN: 9780718106157
- LC Class: PR6013.I3363

Ratman's Notebooks is a 1968 short horror novel by Stephen Gilbert. It features an unnamed social misfit who relates better to rats than to humans. It was the basis for the 1971 film Willard, its 1972 sequel Ben, and the 2003 remake of the original film. After the release of the original film, the book was re-released and re-titled Willard.

== Plot ==
The book is set as a series of journal entries, where the unnamed narrator goes back and forth between his life with the rats and his work, in a low-level job at a company that his father used to own. In these entries, the young man dwells on the hatred he feels for his boss, the stresses of caring for his aging mother, a nameless girl he becomes fond of and above all the families of rats which he has befriended and which he uses for company and companionship.

Eventually, he trains the rats to do things for him. His favorite is an Agouti Berkshire rat (normal wild rat color, only with white markings on the belly, who in the film adaptations was portrayed as a white rat) which he calls "Socrates". A rival to Socrates is "Ben", a large rat that the narrator grows to despise when it refuses to listen to him. He uses the rats to wreak revenge upon his boss and havoc among the local shop owners and home owners, whom he has robbed with the aid of his rats. His "ratman" robberies become a newspaper sensation in the area and the man makes quite a stash of money for himself and for the girl he is courting at work. After his mother dies, he inherits the house.

When Socrates is killed at his workplace by his boss Mr. Jones, the narrator is forced to use Ben in his criminal escapades. He devises a plan to have the rats kill Mr. Jones, avenging Socrates' death. He then abandons all the rats at the scene of the crime, ridding himself of that part of his life. Eventually, as his relationship with the office girl moves towards marriage, Ben and his colony return, chasing the girl out of the house and trapping him in the attic.

The book ends with the narrator madly scribbling in his journal about the rats gnawing away at the attic door.

== Reprint ==
In 2013, Valancourt Books reprinted Ratman's Notebooks in paperback with an introduction by horror author Kim Newman.
