= Stephen Gilbert (novelist) =

Northern Irish novelist

- Born: 22 July 1912; Newcastle, County Down
- Died: 23 June 2010 (aged 97); Carrickfergus, County Antrim
- Education: Loretto School, Musselburgh
- Occupation: Author
- Notable work: Ratman's Notebooks (1968)
- Movement: Campaign for Nuclear Disarmament

Stephen Gilbert (22 July 1912 – 23 June 2010) was a Northern Irish author. On the strength of his early novels in the 1940s, Gilbert was accounted by E. M. Forster as "a writer of distinction", but he is chiefly remembered as the author of Ratman's Notebooks (1968) which sold over 1 million copies and was twice made into a horror film named Willard (1971 and 2003) in the United States.

== Early life ==
Stephen Gilbert was born in Newcastle, County Down in 1912 into a prosperous Irish Protestant mercantile family and grew up mainly in an affluent district of Belfast East. Like his near-contemporaries C. S. Lewis and Louis MacNeice, the young Gilbert was sent "across the water" to school. From age 10 he attended The Leas, Hoylake on Merseyside in England and from age 13 Loretto School, Musselburgh in Scotland. He returned from Musselburgh without a Leaving Certificate, but not before manifesting his budding literary talent. Gilbert, occasionally helped by school friends, produced The Broadcaster, a handwritten and illustrated digest of stories, news and essays which he would post to relatives back home.

In Belfast, he worked briefly as a court reporter for the Northern Whig (a witness to magistrates imposing fines on failed suicides; Gilbert in later years volunteered with the Samaritans). From the mid-1930s, he was working full time in his father's tea and seed business, Samuel McCausland Ltd.

== Relationship with Forrest Reid ==
In 1931, just before his 19th birthday, Gilbert met the novelist Forrest Reid, then in his mid-50s. Reid's many novels reflect his fascination with teenage boys and he was drawn to Gilbert. The two commenced a turbulent relationship that lasted until Reid's death in 1947. Reid acted as a mentor to Gilbert and depicts an idealised version of their relationship (opening with a holiday encounter in the seaside town of Ballycastle) in his novel Brian Westby (1944). The relationship appeared platonic, but Gilbert found Reid's demands, and interference in his affairs, excessive.

Gilbert's later novel, The Burnaby Experiments (1952), appearing five years after Reid's death, has been read as "a thinly disguised portrayal of their relationship from Gilbert's point of view and a belated response to Brian Westby".

== First novels ==
Gilbert's first novel, The Landslide (1943), a fantasy involving prehistoric creatures uncovered in a landslide in a remote part of Ireland, was dedicated to Reid. The creatures are benevolent, but upset the order of things. It was released to positive reviews, including one from E. M. Forster (a friend of Reid's) speaking on the BBC. A second novel, Bombardier, appeared the following year. It is based on his volunteer wartime experiences with the 3rd (Ulster) Searchlight Regiment, Royal Artillery in France, including the evacuation at Dunkirk (Gilbert was awarded the Military Medal for burning a bridge in the face of an enemy advance). Bombardier was a moderate financial success, going through at least two printings.

According to Andrew Doyle's introduction to the 2014 reprint of Monkeyface (1948), that book and The Burnaby Experiments (1952) were both well received by critics, but neither was a financial or popular success. Monkeyface told the story of an ape-man missing link who is brought from the jungles of South America to the U.K. and learns to speak English, but struggles with adapting to modern human society. Burnaby follows a young man's strange experiences with an eccentric uncle's research into the possibility of the survival of the human soul after death.

== Post-war family and political engagement ==
While in service during World War II, Gilbert corresponded with his fiancé Kathleen Stevenson, a distant relative, who had joined the Women's Auxiliary Air Force (WAAF). She was stationed in North Africa where she was twice mentioned in dispatches. The two were married in Belfast in 1945 and set up home at Gilnahirk, on the eastern edge of the city, with Gilbert dividing his time between the family business, to which he returned, and writing. The couple had four children.

By 1960, Gilbert felt that he might "be finished as a writer". He found new engagement in the Campaign for Nuclear Disarmament. He founded the CND's Northern Ireland branch, served as its secretary and helped organize marches and demonstrations. "What was the good of all the writers, all human achievement", he asked, "if there was going to be no audience?". The possibility of misused science rending all art and civilization apart can be seen as a connecting theme for some of his more fantastical plot twists, not all of which persuaded publishers.

In the mid-1970s, Gilbert moved to Straid, County Antrim, where his wife ran a small beef farm and bred Shetland ponies. They lived there until a few years before their deaths.

== Ratman's Notebooks ==
In 1968 Gilbert did have an unexpected success with Ratman's Notebooks, the last work published in his lifetime. The story of an emotionally deadened, but embittered, youth who trains rats to attack and kill his enemies, it was filmed twice in the United States as Willard. The first film adaptation, directed by Daniel Mann and starring Bruce Davison, Ernest Borgnine, Sondra Locke and Elsa Lanchester, was released in 1971, opening to good reviews and high box office returns. It was followed in 1972 by an original film sequel called Ben.

The original film was remade in 2003, directed by Glen Morgan and starring Crispin Glover, R. Lee Ermey and Laura Elena Harring. More loosely based on Gilbert's original work, it was also a relative box office success.

== The Bloody City ==
Stephen Gilbert died at a nursing home at Whitehead, north of Carrickfergus, County Antrim on 23 June 2010 at age 97.

In 2015, five years after Gilbert's death, Valancourt Books, an independent American publishing house dedicated to "the rediscovery of rare, neglected, and out-of-print fiction," published a limited edition of an unfinished novel. Edited and compiled by the playwright and comedian Andrew Doyle, it draws on manuscripts in the possession of the author's son, Tom Gilbert, and of Queen's University, Belfast.

The Bloody City is a realist novel, that takes the reader through the first year of the Northern Ireland Troubles: it begins in the final months of 1968 as the Northern Ireland civil rights movement takes to the streets and ends after the August 1969 riots. The protagonist is, to a degree, autobiographical. Like Gilbert, "Frank Downton" is a son attempting to work with his father in a family business that, in many respects, is a stolid representation of the city's dissolving Victorian and Unionist order. Downton is caught up in the street violence and in the sectarian, class and sexual tensions of the workplace.

Gilbert personally was close to some of the action described, or alluded to, in the novel. While writing the novel, he was living on Colin Road in predominately Catholic-Nationalist Belfast West, "an unlikely, indeed hazardous, habitation", local writer and critic Patricia Craig noted in her obituary for Gilbert, for "a middle-class Belfast Presbyterian who sounded like an Englishman". His place of business, Samuel McCausland Ltd, suffered damage from fire bombs, blast bombs and a car bomb to which Gilbert attributed an employee's fatal heart attack.

== Stephen Gilbert papers ==
The Stephen Gilbert Collection at Queens University, Belfast includes correspondence with authors Walter de la Mare, George Buchanan, Forrest Reid and E. M. Forster. In addition to a draft for The Bloody City, the collection also holds a completed manuscript for another unpublished novel, Dear Granny and Sweet Child (or Granny Carson’s Sex Fantasy).

== Published works ==
- The Landslide (1943)
- Bombardier (1944)
- Monkeyface (1948)
- The Burnaby Experiments (1952)
- Ratman's Notebooks (1968), later filmed and published as Willard.
- The Bloody City (2015)

In 2012, Valancourt Books began reprinting the works of Stephen Gilbert. The Landslide, Bombardier, Monkeyface, The Burnaby Experiments and Ratman's Notebooks are all currently in print.
