= Bruce Glover =

American actor (1932–2025)

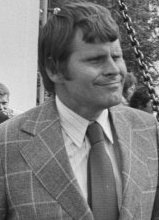
- Bruce Glover as Mr. Wint during filming of Diamonds Are Forever (1971)
- Born: Bruce Herbert Glover; May 2, 1932; Chicago, Illinois, U.S.
- Died: March 12, 2025 (aged 92); Los Angeles, California, U.S.
- Occupation: Actor
- Years active: 1958–2021
- Spouses: Connie Overstake (m. 1949; div. 1950) Marion Elizabeth Lillian "Betty" Krachey (m. 1960; died 2016)
- Children: 2, including Crispin

Bruce Herbert Glover (May 2, 1932 – March 12, 2025) was an American character actor, who is best known for portraying the assassin Mr. Wint in the James Bond film Diamonds Are Forever (1971). Other notable film appearances include roles in Walking Tall (1973), Chinatown (1974), and Hard Times (1975).

He was the father of actor Crispin Glover, with his final screen appearance being in No! You're Wrong. or: Spooky Action at a Distance (2025), which he co-wrote and co-starred in with Crispin, who also directed.

== Life and career ==
Glover was born in Chicago to Eva Elvira (née Hedstrom) and Herbert Homan Glover. He was of English, Czech, and Swedish descent.

Glover was drafted into the U.S. Army serving from 1953 to 1955 where he served six months in Korea.

He began acting with numerous appearances on various television shows including My Favorite Martian (1963), Perry Mason: The Case of the Golden Girls (1965), The Rat Patrol (1966), Hawk (1966), The Mod Squad (1968), Gunsmoke (1969), Adam-12 (1969), Mission: Impossible (1970), Bearcats! (1971), Police Story (1977), The Feather & Father Gang (1977), Barney Miller (1978), CHiPs (1978), and The Dukes of Hazzard (1979).

In 1971, Glover and jazz musician Putter Smith portrayed the assassins Mr. Wint and Mr. Kidd, respectively, in the James Bond film Diamonds Are Forever.

Glover played a motorcycle gang leader known as Bach in the Adam-12 episode Log 103: A Sound Like Thunder (1969). He also played a redneck thug harassing well-meaning teenagers in the drama Bless the Beasts and Children (1971), was leaning on hustler James Coburn to repay his debts in Hard Times (1975), and contributed another icy performance as Duffy in Chinatown (1974). In addition, he appeared as Captain Voda, a Soviet military officer, in "Doomsday, and Counting", an episode of The Six Million Dollar Man.

Glover also appeared as deputy Grady Coker in the film Walking Tall (1973) and the sequels: Walking Tall Part 2 (1975) and Walking Tall: Final Chapter (1977). In 1978, Glover appeared as Megan, the father of children who rescue Starbuck (Dirk Benedict) on a backwater planet, in Battlestar Galactica's "The Young Lords." He remained busy through the 1980s and 1990s with more guest spots on TV shows including Hart to Hart (1981), T. J. Hooker (1982), The A-Team (1983), and Murder, She Wrote (1989). He also appeared in the films Ghost Town (1988), Popcorn (1991), and Warlock: The Armageddon (1993).

In the 1950s, Glover began to teach acting. In the 1970s, he conducted acting classes with "The Indian Actors Workshops" and had various acting studios around West Los Angeles. In the 1990s, Glover added an additional level to his residence to accommodate an acting studio.

Glover was interviewed by Chris Aable on the cable television show Hollywood Today (1995), and appeared in the films Night of the Scarecrow (1995), Die Hard Dracula (1998), and Ghost World (2001).

== Death ==
Glover died at a Los Angeles hospital on March 12, 2025, at the age of 92. His son Crispin announced his father's death on Instagram with a tribute of personal and professional pictures on March 29.

== Selected filmography ==
- Never Steal Anything Small (1959) – Stevedore (uncredited)
- Who Killed Teddy Bear (1965) – Frank
- Frankenstein Meets the Space Monster (1965) – Martian Crewmember / The Space Monster (uncredited)
- Blindfold (1965) – Sailor in Cab (uncredited)
- Sweet Love, Bitter (1967)
- The Thomas Crown Affair (1968) – Bank Manager (uncredited)
- Dayton's Devils (1968)
- C.C. and Company (1970) – Captain Midnight
- Bless the Beasts and Children (1971) – Hustler
- Scandalous John (1971) – Sludge
- Diamonds Are Forever (1971) – Mr. Wint
- Black Gunn (1972) – Ray Kriley
- Walking Tall (1973) – Grady Coker
- One Little Indian (1973) – Schrader
- Chinatown (1974) – Duffy
- Hard Times (1975) – Doty
- Walking Tall Part 2 (1975) – Grady Coker
- Stunts (1977) – Chuck Johnson
- Walking Tall: Final Chapter (1977) – Deputy Grady
- CHiPs "Drive, Lady, Drive - Part I & II" (1979) – Chuck Harris
- Sultan and the Rock Star (1980) – Alec Frost
- Hart to Hart (1981) – Wilkes
- The Big Score (1983) – Koslo
- Hunter's Blood (1986) – One Eye
- Big Bad Mama II (1987) – Morgan Crawford
- Ghost Town (1988) – Dealer
- Hider in the House (1989) – Gene Hufford
- Penny Ante: The Motion Picture (1990) – Roy
- Popcorn (1991) – Vernon
- Chaindance (1991) – Casey
- Shakespeare's Plan 12 from Outer Space (1991)
- Street Wars (1992) – Chief Reed (uncredited)
- Warlock: The Armageddon (1993) – Ted Ellison
- Night of the Scarecrow (1995) – Thaddeus
- American Hero (1997) – General Clover
- Die Hard Dracula (1998) – Doctor Van Helsing
- Spoiler (1998) – Priest
- Suicide, the Comedy (1998) – Lap Dance Bob (uncredited)
- Ghost World (2001) – Feldman the Wheel Chair Guy
- Will Unplugged (2005) – Warren
- Simon Says (2006) – Sam
- It Is Fine! Everything Is Fine. (2007) – The Ex-Husband
- Broke Sky (2007) – Rufus
- Buffalo Bushido (2009) – Soup / Javier
- Six Days in Paradise (2010) – Frank Burns
- Scammerhead (2014) – Wyndham Bawtree
- Hiszpanka (2015) – Kubryk
- No! You're Wrong. or: Spooky Action at a Distance (2025) - Apollo Muldoon (1888) / Brutus Muldoon (1918) / Chronos Muldoon (1948)
