= Willard (1971 film) =

American horror film by Daniel Mann

- Theatrical release poster
- Directed by: Daniel Mann
- Screenplay by: Gilbert Ralston
- Based on: Ratman's Notebooks by Stephen Gilbert
- Produced by: Mort Briskin
- Starring: Bruce Davison; Elsa Lanchester; Ernest Borgnine; Sondra Locke
- Cinematography: Robert B. Hauser
- Edited by: Warren Low
- Music by: Alex North
- Production company: Bing Crosby Productions
- Distributed by: Cinerama Releasing Corporation
- Release date: February 26, 1971
- Running time: 95 minutes
- Country: United States
- Language: English
- Box office: $14.5 million

Willard is a 1971 American horror film directed by Daniel Mann and written by Gilbert Ralston, based on Stephen Gilbert's novel Ratman's Notebooks. Bruce Davison stars as social misfit Willard Stiles, who is squeezed out of the company started by his deceased father. His only friends are a few rats raised at home, including Ben and Socrates, and their increasing number of friends. When Socrates is killed by Willard's boss, he goes on a rampage using his rats to attack.

Willard was released on February 26, 1971, by Cinerama Releasing Corporation, opening to mixed reviews, but it was successful at the box office, making it the 11th-highest-grossing release of the year. It was also nominated for an Edgar Award for Best Picture.

The film was followed by a 1972 sequel, Ben, and a 2003 remake, also titled Willard, with Crispin Glover portraying Willard, and Davison making a cameo as Willard's father.

== Plot ==
Willard Stiles is a meek social misfit who develops an affinity for rats. He lives in a large house with his cranky and decrepit mother Henrietta. On his 27th birthday, he comes home to a surprise birthday party thrown by his mother, where all of the attendees are her friends. After leaving the party in embarrassment, he notices a rat in his backyard and tosses it pieces of his birthday cake.

His mother tells him to eliminate the rats. Willard uses food and a plank bridge to lure them into a pit in the backyard, then begins filling the pit with water to drown them. However, moved by the rats' piteous squeals as they realize their plight, he replaces the plank, allowing them to get to safety. He later begins playing with a rat he names Queenie. A white rat, which Willard names Socrates, becomes his best companion. Other rats emerge, including a bigger black specimen whom he names Ben.

At work, Willard is tasked with an overwhelming number of accounts by his boss Al Martin, who usurped the business from Willard's father. Willard asks Al for a raise, having not received one since his father's death, despite working after hours and weekends. Al refuses and pressures Willard to sell him his house. Willard sneaks into a party that Al is hosting, opens a rat-filled suitcase, and urges them to get the food. The guests are terrorized by the rats, and Al destroys the catering tables trying to fend them off. The next day, Willard's mother dies. He is informed that she had no money, and the house is heavily mortgaged.

Willard starts bringing Socrates and Ben to the office on Saturdays to keep him company while he is the only one there. His friend and temporary assistant, Joan, gives him a cat named Chloe to comfort him. He hands Chloe off to a stranger. Meanwhile, the rat colony is growing, and Willard cannot afford to keep feeding them. After overhearing one of Al's friends boasting of a large cash withdrawal, he sneaks into the man's house and orders his rats to tear up the bedroom door. The man and his wife flee the house upon seeing the rats, and Willard steals the cash.

The next day, a worker spots the rats. Al bludgeons Socrates to death, devastating Willard. When Joan refuses to persuade Willard to sell his house to Al, he fires her and Willard, believing that unemployment will force Willard to sell. That night, while Al is at work, Willard enters the office with his rats. He confronts Al over the death of Socrates, the mistreatment of his father, and Al's machinations to buy his house. As Al attempts to attack him, Willard orders the rats to attack Al. Disoriented by the swarming rats, Al falls out the window to his death, with the rats eating the corpse, much to Willard’s horror. After witnessing Al's gruesome death, Willard abandons the rats at the scene. The next day, he places his remaining rats into crates, submerges the crates in the water-filled pit until the rats drown, then buries the crates in the back yard. He then seals up any holes through which the rats could enter his house.

Willard has dinner with Joan at his house, telling her of his newfound self-confidence, which he attributes to Socrates and her. Over the course of their conversation, however, he sees Ben staring menacingly at him from a shelf. Investigating, he finds more hordes of rats in the basement. He orders Joan to leave and locks the door behind her. Willard offers Ben and the rats food, which he mixes with pesticide. Ben sniffs the pesticide box and squeals loudly, alerting the others. Willard chases Ben upstairs, cornering him in a storage room. He barricades the door against the other rats, leaving Ben to face him alone. While Ben eludes Willard's attacks, the rats gnaw through the door. Willard shouts, "I was good to you, Ben!", before the rats start to jump on him. Overwhelmed, Willard succumbs to the attack.

== Cast ==
- Bruce Davison as Willard Stiles
- Sondra Locke as Joan
- Elsa Lanchester as Henrietta Stiles
- Ernest Borgnine as Al Martin
- Michael Dante as Brandt
- Jody Gilbert as Charlotte Stassen
- William Hansen as Barskin
- John Myhers as Carlson
- J. Pat O'Malley as Jonathan Farley
- Joan Shawlee as Alice
- Almira Sessions as Carrie Smith
- Pauline Drake as Ida Stassen
- Helen Spring as Mrs. Becker
- Sherry Presnell as Mrs. Spencer
- Alan Baxter as Mr. Spencer
- Minta Durfee (uncredited)

== Production ==
Filming took place in the summer of 1970, and the movie's credits list 1970 for the copyright; the film premiered in February 1971.

== Reception ==
=== Box office ===
The film earned rentals of $9.25 million.

=== Critical reception ===
The film-review aggregator Rotten Tomatoes reported an approval rating of 50%, based on 22 reviews, with a rating average of 5.8/10. The critical consensus reads: "Willard has an intriguing character study lurking within – but much of those elements, like many of the movie's characters, are swallowed up by rats". Metacritic, which uses a weighted average, assigned the film a score of 49 out of 100, based on 4 critics, indicating "mixed or average" reviews.

Vincent Canby of The New York Times dismissed the film as "a dull movie of no major consequence", with the rats "no more scary than fat, friendly hamsters, except for one or two shots when they are seen by the hundreds — and hundreds of anything might be a scary sight, even hundreds of bishops". Variety said: "Neat little horror tale...some good jump moments, at least two stomach-churning murders committed by the rats, and superior production values with tight direction of Daniel Mann develop pic into sound nail-chewer". Roger Ebert of The Chicago Sun-Times gave the film 2 out of 4 stars, disliking how Williard's ability to communicate with rats was never explained. He also was baffled by the film's financial success and proposed, tongue-in-cheek, how the popularity of Willard must have originated with audiences who have "waited a long time to see Ernest Borgnine eaten alive by rats". Gene Siskel of the Chicago Tribune also gave the film 2 out of 4 stars and wrote that although it "will have you keeping your feet up off the theater floor, Daniel Mann's slow direction will lower your eyelids. The acting credits, however, are top notch". Kevin Thomas of the Los Angeles Times wrote that "one could not ask for a more satisfying, yet less pretentious hot-weather suspense-horror entertainment. With its disturbed young hero, crumbling old mansion, and macabre developments, it immediately brings to mind Psycho. The more apt comparison, however, is with that much-cherished English comedy of some years back, The Green Man, in which Alastair Sim (at his drollest) went around blowing up a series of troublesome types". Tom Milne of The Monthly Film Bulletin thought that the rats were "so well-mannered and prettily groomed that they are more likely to elicit coos of delight than shudders of fear...when the horrors do come, they are very tame indeed: not one single shot to match the chilling menace dispensed by the brooding crows in The Birds or the prowling felines in Eye of the Cat. Instead, Daniel Mann settles for facile effects, like the cut-in shot of rats tearing at a piece of raw meat while they are supposedly demolishing Ernest Borgnine, and gradually drives what might have been an unusually intriguing horror film pretty much into the ground". Leonard Maltin gave the film 2 out of 4 stars in his annual home video guide, writing: "Touching story of a boy and his rats captured public's fancy at the box office, but [the] film's lack of style prevents it from being anything more than a second-rate thriller".

Ben the rat won a PATSY Award as the best animal performer in a feature film for 1971.

== Legacy ==
- A sequel, titled Ben, was released in 1972.
- Three imitation films were made based on Willard and Ben's success: Stanley (1972), a film which involved trained rattlesnakes and was released before the second of the two films that inspired it, and two more films both released four years afterward, Kiss of the Tarantula (1976), in which the social misfit was a young woman with trained tarantulas, and Mako: The Jaws of Death (1976), in which the social misfit had a telepathic connection with sharks.
- Willard served as the opening anecdote to the chapter "Becoming-Intense, Becoming-Animal, Becoming-Imperceptible..." in Gilles Deleuze and Felix Guattari's book A Thousand Plateaus.
- A remake, also titled Willard, was released in 2003 with Crispin Glover portraying Willard Stiles. Bruce Davison makes a cameo appearance in the film as Willard's father, appearing only in a portrait in the Stiles' home above the fireplace.

== See also ==
- List of American films of 1971
