= David Brothers =

American filmmaker

- Occupations: Artist; filmmaker
- Style: Installation art
- Website: davidbrothers.net

David Brothers is an American multidisciplinary artist and filmmaker. He is notable for his art installations and co-direction of the avant-garde film It Is Fine! Everything Is Fine. (2007). His work frequently examines the line between the artificial and the authentic, exploring surreal, fantastical, and dystopian themes. Brothers' photography has appeared in publications such as Rolling Stone, Maxim, Popsmear, SLUG, Dear Dave, and Stuff magazines.

== Career ==
=== Artistic Career ===
Brothers began producing, writing, and acting in radio dramas, with notable projects including The Church of Jayne Mansfield and The New Atomic Age. He wrote, illustrated, and published a variety of works, including comic books, pamphlets, religious tracts, trading cards, and Tijuana bibles.

By day, Brothers worked as a film industry set designer. His professional experience constructing sets informs his artwork, where he builds and photographs sets in his studio, creating images that blur the boundary between artifice and reality.

=== Filmmaking Career ===
Brothers has created both animated and live-action films. Three of his films have been featured at the Sundance Film Festival. With Crispin Glover, Brothers co-directed the short film The Backward Swing (1987) and the feature film It Is Fine! Everything Is Fine. (2007). The latter film is the second in Glover’s trilogy. Written by and starring Steven C. Stewart, the film is focused on disability and sexuality. Writing about the film, Time Out said it was “...as surprising for its visual boldness—it looks like Lovelace-era porn as staged by David Lynch—as it is for its sincerity.”
