= What Is It? =

2005 film by Crispin Glover

- Theatrical release poster
- Directed by: Crispin Hellion Glover
- Written by: Crispin Hellion Glover
- Produced by: Crispin Hellion Glover; Matt Devlen; Ryan Page; Mike Pallagi
- Starring: Crispin Glover; Fairuza Balk; Steven C. Stewart; Michael Blevis; Rikky Wittman; John Insinna; Kelly Swiderski; Lisa Fusco
- Cinematography: Wyatt Troll
- Edited by: Crispin Hellion Glover
- Production company: Volcanic Eruptions
- Distributed by: Volcanic Eruptions
- Release date: January 27, 2005 (Sundance)
- Running time: 72 minutes
- Country: United States
- Language: English

What Is It? is a 2005 American surrealist film written, edited, co-produced and directed by Crispin Glover and starring Glover, Steven C. Stewart and the voice of Fairuza Balk.

What Is It? is the first entry in a planned trilogy directed by Glover, followed by It Is Fine! Everything Is Fine. (2007) and continued with It Is Mine.

== Synopsis ==
The "adventures" of a young man whose principal interests are snails, salt, a pipe, and how to get home, who is tormented by a hubristic, racist inner psyche.

== Cast ==
- Michael Blevis as The Young Man
- Rikky Wittman as The Minstrel's Nemisis
- John Insinna as The Young Man's Outer Sanctum Friend / Inner Santum Choking Victim
- Kelly Swiderski as Inner Sanctum Concubine / Outer Sanctum Snail Collector
- Lisa Fusco as The Young Man's Fantasy Girl
- Crispin Glover as Dueling Demi-God Auteur / The Young Man's Inner Psyche
- Steven C. Stewart as Dueling Demi-God Auteur / Young Man's Uber Ego
- Fairuza Balk as Snail (voice)
- Robin Adams as Inner Sanctum Concubine / Outer Sanctum Girl who Recognizes Burning
- Cheryl Brown as Outer Sanctum Mocking Tormentor / Walkie-Talkie Grabbing Woman That Cries Later
- Tom Carroll as Grave Digger / Mocking Tormentor
- Lynn Conley as The Minstrel's Concubine / Mocking Tormentor / Ultimate Outer Sanctum Victor
- Mary P. Hayes as The Young Man's Mother
- Adam Parfrey as The Minstrel

== Production ==
Production of the film started in 1996 as a short film that was to be used as a proof of concept for the as of yet unproduced third film in Glover's It trilogy, It Is Mine. After completing the filming of the initial short, Glover decided to turn it into a feature-length film and filmed an additional eight days over two years. David Lynch, who had directed Glover in Wild at Heart (1990) and Hotel Room (1993), had agreed to executive produce It Is Mine early in its development. However, as revealed in his 2018 autobiography Room to Dream, Lynch was under the impression he had executive produced What Is It?, which Glover credits to a miscommunication they had when he screened a rough cut of What Is It? for Lynch.

Although the edit was picture locked around three years after the initial shoot, post-production lingered on for six more years due to a technical error related to the SMPTE timecode and also because of Glover focusing on the production of the second film of the trilogy, It Is Fine! Everything Is Fine. (2007), which started filming in 2001 to accommodate the declining health of the film's lead actor and writer, Steven C. Stewart. What Is It? was shot on 16 mm film stock and is usually projected on a 35 mm film print.

The majority of actors who appear in the film have Down syndrome, but Glover has stated they are not necessarily portraying characters with Down Syndrome and the film is not about Down Syndrome. Featuring taboo content and imagery, such as Nazi imagery, black face, and graphic sexuality, Glover sees the themes of the film relating to his "psychological reaction to the corporate restraints that have happened in the last 30 or more years in filmmaking. Specifically, in that anything that can possibly make an audience uncomfortable is necessarily excised, or the film will not be corporately funded or distributed."

== Release ==
The film premiered at the 2005 Sundance Film Festival and played at several other film festivals, including Method Fest, where Glover received a Maverick Award presented to him by filmmaker Werner Herzog. Aside from this, it has only been shown at independent theatres, typically accompanied by a question-and-answer session, a one-hour dramatic narration of eight different profusely illustrated books as a slideshow, and a meet-and-greet/book signing with Glover.

== Reception ==
The film had received a 50% approval rating on Rotten Tomatoes based on 10 reviews, with an average rating of 6.2/10.

Jonathan Rosenbaum wrote that What Is It? "tries hard to be as eccentric as [Glover's] performances and fully succeeds. It also manages to be fairly repulsive, which also seems intentional", disparagingly noting that Glover "lacks both the self-imposed ideological innocence and the talent for composing sounds and images of David Lynch". Michael Wilmington of the Chicago Tribune complimented the risks taken by Glover in delivering the film's anti-establishment themes, quesioning "how many Hollywood movie stars, of whatever stripe, would cast their first film largely with actors with Down syndrome, along with nude women wearing monkey heads, and then use a soundtrack of Richard Wagner’s classical music and racist rock ‘n’ roll by Klan favorite Johnny Rebel?" He adds, however, that "What Is It? is a shocker, but not a world-class one".

In a positive review for The New York Times, Laura Kern praised Glover as a "brave visionary unafraid to deliver a kick in the teeth to Hollywood or to address society's discomfort with the handicapped."
