= It Is Fine! Everything Is Fine. =

It is Fine! Everything Is Fine.
- Theatrical release poster
- Directed by: Crispin Hellion Glover; David Brothers
- Written by: Steven C. Stewart
- Produced by: Crispin Hellion Glover
- Starring: Margit Carstensen; Steven C. Stewart; Carrie Szlasa; Lauren German; Jami Ferrell; Curtis James; Bruce Glover
- Edited by: Molly Fitzjarrald; Crispin Hellion Glover
- Music by: Crispin Hellion Glover (music supervisor)
- Production company: Volcanic Eruptions
- Distributed by: Volcanic Eruptions
- Release date: January 23, 2007 (Sundance)
- Running time: 74 minutes
- Country: United States
- Language: English

It Is Fine! Everything Is Fine. is a 2007 American independent drama film directed by David Brothers and Crispin Glover. It was written by and stars Steven C. Stewart. It also stars Margit Carstensen.

It Is Fine is the second in a planned trilogy of films directed by Glover (all of them under the amplificated title "A Crispin Hellion Glover Film"), with the other two entries being What Is It? (2005) and It Is Mine (TBA).

== Synopsis ==
A psycho-sexual, fantastical retelling of the life of a man with cerebral palsy and a fetish for girls with long hair.

== Cast ==
- Steven C. Stewart as Paul Baker
- Margit Carstensen as Linda Barnes
- Carrie Szlasa as Karma Barnes
- Jami Ferrell as Julie (Drunk Model)
- April Hoglund as Girl in Nursing Home
- Anna Stave as Girl in Street
- Lauren German as Ruth
- Billy Stockholm as Nursing Home Roommate
- Curtis James as Detective #1
- Tony Larmier as Detective #2
- Tahir Kljucanin as Beauty Shop Hairdresser
- Bruce Glover as The Ex
- Betty Glover as Mrs. Hancock - The Boss

== Production ==
The film was completely funded by Crispin Glover, through his production company Volcanic Eruptions, using his salary from acting in Charlie's Angels (2000) and other films. It was written by and stars Utah writer-actor Steven C. Stewart, who also appears in What Is It? (2005). Glover and co-director and production designer David Brothers were working on an eventually unfinished project together in the late 1980s when Brothers passed Stewart's screenplay on to Glover, which the two committed to directing together with Stewart in the lead role.

Although still in the midst of post-production of What Is It?, Glover started shooting It Is Fine! Everything Is Fine. in 2001 due to Stewart's declining health making it apparent he did not have long left to live. The film was shot intermittently over six months. Stewart died of complications from cerebral palsy only one month after principal filming wrapped.

Glover has said that Stewart's script was in the style of a 1970s made-for-TV movie, and has said that "It's an autobiographical, psychosexual, fantastical retelling of [Stewart's] point-of-view of life." Apart from the opening and closing scenes that were filmed in a nursing home, It is Fine. Everything is Fine! was shot entirely at David Brothers's sound stage in Salt Lake City, Utah. It Is Fine! Everything is Fine. was shot on 16 mm film stock and is usually projected on a 35 mm film print. Glover has stated that it is "probably the best film [he'll] ever work on in [his] entire career."

== Release ==
This film premiered at the Egyptian Theater in Park City, Utah on January 23, 2007 for the Midnight screening as an official selection of the 2007 Sundance Film Festival. Glover screens the film alongside What Is It? at independent cinemas, typically accompanied by a question-and-answer session, a one-hour dramatic narration of eight different profusely illustrated books as a slideshow, and a meet-and-greet/book signing with Glover.

== Reception ==
The film had received an 80% approval rating on Rotten Tomatoes based on 10 reviews.

In a review awarding the film three out of four stars, the Chicago Tribune's Michael Philips described It Is Fine! Everything Is Fine. as "one of the most queasy-making and confrontational films of the year". John Anderson of Variety praised the film for recognising that "handicapped people can not only be as sensitive as everyone else, but just as horrible" and applauded the "otherworldly vision" presented by the cinematography and tone. Likewise, reviewing the film for Time Out, Ben Kenigsberg wrote positively of the film's "visual boldness", singling out the "at once primitive and garish" set design.

Giving the film a more negative review, Eric Kohn acknowledged that the plight of Stewart "gives significance to the art", but deemed the film hard to engage with, viewing it as "operat[ing] under the guise of exploitation."
