= Ben (1972 film) =

1972 film by Phil Karlson

- Theatrical release poster
- Directed by: Phil Karlson
- Written by: Gilbert Ralston
- Based on: Characters created by Stephen Gilbert
- Produced by: Mort Briskin
- Starring: Lee Montgomery; Joseph Campanella; Arthur O'Connell
- Cinematography: Russell Metty
- Edited by: Harry Gerstad
- Music by: Walter Scharf
- Production company: Bing Crosby Productions
- Distributed by: Cinerama Releasing Corporation
- Release date: June 23, 1972
- Running time: 94 minutes
- Country: United States
- Language: English
- Box office: $2.3 million

Ben is a 1972 American horror film directed by Phil Karlson and starring Lee Montgomery, Joseph Campanella, and Arthur O'Connell. It is a sequel to the film Willard (1971). The film follows a lonely boy named Danny Garrison who befriends Willard's former pet rat named Ben. Ben becomes the boy's best friend, protecting him from bullying and keeping his spirits up in the face of a heart condition. However, Ben forms an army of deadly rodents while the police attempt to control it.

The film premiered on June 21, 1972 in California and was given a wide release on June 23 by Cinerama Releasing Corporation. Much like its predecessor, it was met with mixed reviews.

American singer Michael Jackson performs the theme song of the film, also titled "Ben". The song is also included on his 1972 album of the same name.

== Plot ==
The movie begins with a recap of the ending of the first film where Willard Stiles is killed by his rats after he tries to kill them and Ben. Police arrive at the scene and find Willard dead. Two police officers stay at the Stiles house where one of them is attacked and killed by the rats while the other finds his body. A police detective named Clift Kirtland orders to have an exterminator to kill the rats, but Ben hears this and tells the other rats. Together, Ben and the other rats go into the sewer.

A lonely boy named Danny Garrison, who has a severe heart condition, lives with his sister, Eve, and his mother, Beth. Danny finds and befriends Ben while playing with marionettes in his workshed, and Ben becomes the boy's best friend. Later that day, Ben and the other rats attack a food truck, causing the driver to crash and kill another driver.

The next day, Danny plays on the piano a song he has created for Ben. Later that night, Ben and the other rats invade a grocery store for food and destroy the entire store. Police officers and detectives are now trying to kill the rats with poison and traps in the neighborhood, but Danny tells Ben about the traps set up by the police. Just then, a bully comes to make fun of Danny, but Ben and the other rats attack the bully by biting him in the legs. The bully gets scared and runs away. Danny thanks Ben and the rats for helping him with the bully. The bully comes back with his mother and the police. The police tell Danny they want to see Ben, so Danny brings them to the workshed and throws at them a marionette he made that looks like Ben. The police, with the bully and the bully's mother, leave the workshed.

However, things gradually take a downhill turn as Ben's colony becomes violent in its search for food, resulting in several deaths. Eventually, the police go into the sewers and kill the rats with flamethrowers and shotguns after trapping them there, but Ben somehow survives the slaughter and makes his way back to Danny, wounded but alive. A tearful and overjoyed Danny tends to the injured Ben, determined not to lose his best friend.

== Cast ==
- Lee Harcourt Montgomery as Danny Garrison
- Joseph Campanella as Cliff Kirtland
- Arthur O'Connell as Billy Hatfield
- Rosemary Murphy as Beth Garrison
- Meredith Baxter as Eve Garrison
- Kaz Garas as Joe Greer
- Paul Carr as Kelly
- Richard van Vleet as Reade
- Kenneth Tobey as Engineer
- James Luisi as Ed
- Lee Paul as Carey
- Norman Alden as Policeman
- Scott Garrett as Henry Gray
- Arlen Stuart as Mrs. Gray
- Ric Drasin as George
- Bruce Davison as Willard Stiles (archive footage)

== Music ==
=== Theme song ===
The film's theme song "Ben", composed by Walter Scharf, is performed by Lee Montgomery in the film and by Michael Jackson during the final scene and end credits. Michael Jackson's version of the song, recorded in October 1971 at Motown's Los Angeles studio, became a number 1 pop hit single in 1972. Later included as the title track on Michael Jackson's second solo album, Ben, it won a Golden Globe Award for Best Original Song and was nominated for an Academy Award for Best Original Song (it lost to "The Morning After" by Maureen McGovern from another 1972 film, The Poseidon Adventure).

The song is calm and mellow, which contrasts with the horror content of the film. A live recorded version was released on the album The Jacksons Live! (1981) and eventually appeared on Michael Jackson's album Number Ones (2003).

Crispin Glover recorded a version of the song for the soundtrack of the 2003 remake of Willard. A music video for this version was produced, which also featured Glover.

== Reception ==
Ben received mixed reviews from critics. It holds a rating of 60% on Rotten Tomatoes, based on 10 reviews.

Among the more positive reviews was that of Variety, which wrote that the film has the "same type of suspenseful action" as the original, and that Lee Montgomery "plays his part to perfection". Gene Siskel of the Chicago Tribune gave the film 3 1/2 stars out of 4, and stated, "Ben succeeds as a horror show because it contains the requisite number of rat attacks with the camera holding on victims covered with perhaps two dozen, clinging, scratching, and biting rodents. Omigod, he's covered with rats. Eeeech! But Ben goes beyond mere thrills into the realm of solid drama because of the superb performance of Lee Harcourt Montgomery as Danny Garrison who befriends Ben, the leader of the rat pack terrorizing the city". Kevin Thomas of the Los Angeles Times wrote that the film "is equally scary and diverting as Willard while being more serious and ambitious".

However, Roger Ebert of the Chicago Sun-Times gave the film 1 1/2 stars out of 4, writing: "This isn't a thriller but a geek movie. In a thriller, we're supposed to be scared by some awesome menace to mankind—the Green Blob maybe, or Big Foot, or the Invincible Squid and his implacable enemy, red wine sauce. But in a geek movie, the whole idea is to be disgusted because the actors have rats all over them". Vincent Canby of The New York Times said: "The way in which you will respond to Ben will depend on a number of variables, including how you feel about the possibility of Los Angeles shutting down, trick photography, dreadful acting by a dreadful cast, the decline and fall of Phil Karlson (The Phenix City Story) as a director and a screenplay that never has the courage to acknowledge its comic impulses". Gary Arnold of The Washington Post thought that the film is "not much of an improvement on Willard" and has "no standout horror sequences". Leonard Maltin's film guide also gave the film a negative review, awarding it 1 1/2 out of 4 stars, and panning the film's gory visuals.

The film is recognized by the American Film Institute in the following list:

- 2004: AFI's 100 Years...100 Songs: "Ben" – Nominated

== See also ==
- List of American films of 1972
