= Plan 10 from Outer Space =

1994 SciFi film

- Directed by: Trent Harris
- Written by: Trent Harris
- Produced by: Walter Hart
- Starring: Karen Black; Stefene Russell; Curtis James; David "Deva" Cantrell; Patrick Collins
- Music by: Fred Myrow
- Distributed by: Leo Films
- Release date: 1995
- Running time: 80 minutes
- Country: United States
- Language: English

Plan 10 from Outer Space is a 1995 low budget science fiction film starring Karen Black as Nehor and written and directed by Trent Harris. The film is a surreal satire of Mormon theology. The film has no connection to Plan 9 from Outer Space (1957) other than its title and the fact that both films feature aliens.

This film premiered at the Sundance Film Festival in 1995 in the midnight madness category. It also received the jury prize at the Raindance Film Festival in London in 1995.

Parts of the film were shot in Salt Lake City and the Great Salt Lake in Utah.

== Plot synopsis ==
In 1853, Norman Talmage (Curtis James), a mad and disreputable early Mormon prophet, buried a bronze plaque near the shore of the Great Salt Lake. A century later, a young non-practicing Mormon Lucinda Hall (Stefene Russell) is attempting to write a novel about things in her daily life (like her panty-obsessed brother), but is constantly distracted by her bearded oddball neighbour (Curtis James) who likes to dance semi-naked with his curtains open. She accidentally discovers the artifact, called Plaque of Kolob, and becomes obsessed with uncovering its meaning. Eventually, upon deciphering it, she is sucked into a strange world, learning that aliens in beehive-shaped spaceships led by Nehor (Karen Black), the operatic queen from Planet Kolob, are on their way to carry out a grudge against Joseph Smith, with the ultimate goal of world domination. Fortunately, she has help from other people who work together to save Earth.

== Notes and references ==
- Astle, Randy (May 1, 2013). "On Being a Cult Filmmaker: An Interview with Trent Harris". Filmmaker.
