= Crispin Glover =

American actor (born 1964)

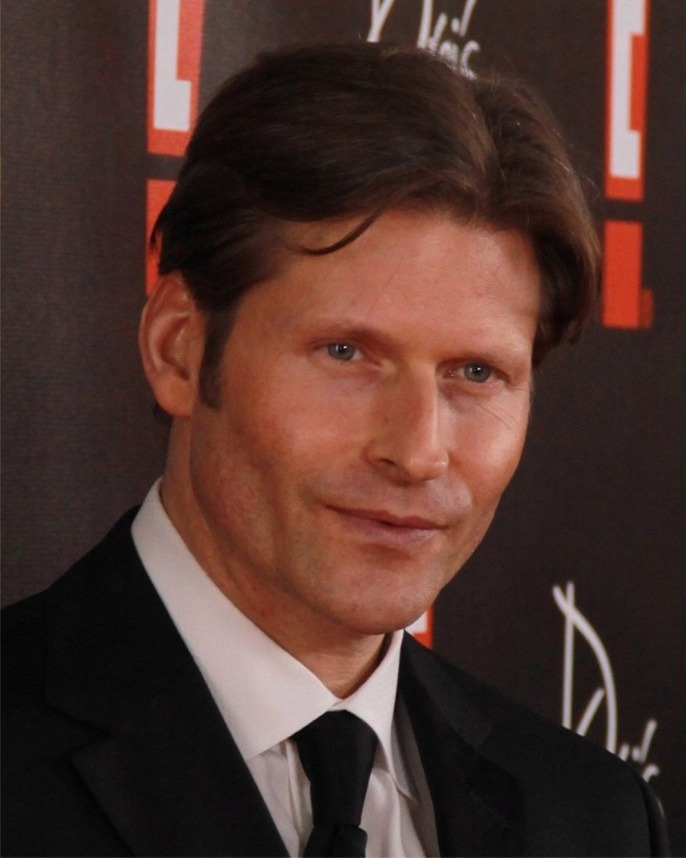
- Glover in 2010
- Born: Crispin Hellion Glover; April 20, 1964 (age 62); New York City, U.S.
- Occupation: Actor
- Years active: 1978–present
- Father: Bruce Glover
- Website: crispinglover.com

Crispin Hellion Glover (born April 20, 1964) is an American actor, filmmaker, author, and artist. He is known for portraying eccentric character roles on screen. His breakout role was as George McFly in Back to the Future (1985), which he followed by playing one of the leading roles in River's Edge (1986). Through the 1990s, Glover garnered attention for portraying smaller roles in films such as Wild at Heart (1990), The Doors (1991), What's Eating Gilbert Grape (1993), and Dead Man (1995).

Starting with his role as the Thin Man in Charlie's Angels (2000), he began to star in more mainstream films. These films include a reprisal of the Thin Man in Charlie's Angels: Full Throttle (2003), Willard (2003), Beowulf (2007), Alice in Wonderland (2010), and Hot Tub Time Machine (2010). From 2017 to 2021, he starred as Mr. World in the Starz television series American Gods.

Glover has published books, such as Rat Catching (1988), and has directed art films, such as What Is It? (2005), It Is Fine! Everything Is Fine. (2007), and No! You're Wrong. or: Spooky Action at a Distance (2025). These films have never received a traditional theatrical release; instead, Glover tours with the films, holding screenings in theatres around the world.

== Early life ==
Glover was born in New York City and moved to Los Angeles with his family at the age of five. He is the son of actor Bruce Glover and actress and dancer Marion Elizabeth Lillian "Betty" Krachey, who retired upon his birth. He was named after the Saint Crispin's Day speech from William Shakespeare's play Henry V, which his parents enjoyed. "Hellion", his real middle name, had earlier been used as a false middle name by his father, who did not like his own real Germanic middle name, Herbert.

Glover's father was of British, Czech, and Swedish descent, while his mother has Czech and German ancestry. As a child, Glover attended the Mirman School from first through ninth grades. He then attended both Venice High for 10th and 11th grades, and Beverly Hills High School for 12th grade; he graduated in 1982.

== Career ==
=== Acting ===
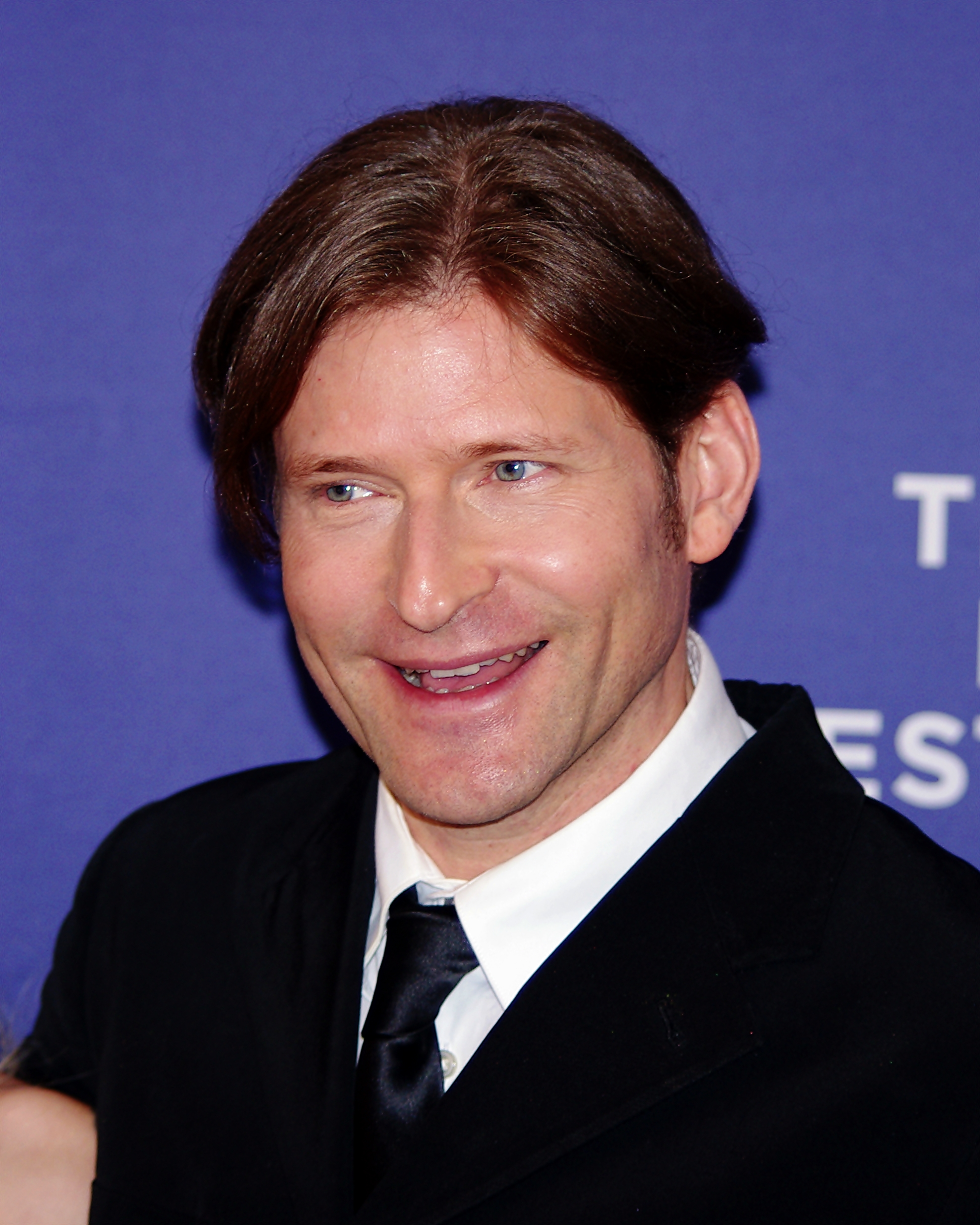
Glover at the 2012 Tribeca Film Festival

Glover began acting professionally at the age of 13, his first role being Friedrich von Trapp in a theatre production of The Sound of Music at the Dorothy Chandler Pavilion with Florence Henderson. He appeared in several sitcoms as a teenager, including Happy Days and Family Ties. He appeared in a main role alongside Nicolas Cage in a television pilot titled The Best Of Times (1981), which aired on ABC, but was never picked up by the network. His first film role was in My Tutor (1983), which he subsequently followed with roles in Teachers and Friday the 13th: The Final Chapter (both 1984). He then worked with director Trent Harris on the third chapter of the Beaver Trilogy, titled The Orkly Kid (1985).

His breakout role was as George McFly in Robert Zemeckis's Back to the Future (1985), an international box-office success. During filming, Glover vocalized his objections to the film's ending, believing it equated material reward with moral success. Zemeckis ignored his complaints. Due to these initial disagreements and a salary dispute, Glover did not return for either of the Back to the Future sequels, and his role was taken over by Jeffrey Weissman.

After the success of Back to the Future, Glover sought to star in films that "questioned" the status quo and contained themes that aligned with his own interests. This pursuit led him to star as Layne in River's Edge (1986). Struggling to find any other films that reflected his own interests, Glover sought to work with film directors he admired. These include David Lynch on Wild at Heart (1990) and Hotel Room (1993), John Boorman on Where the Heart Is (1990), Dennis Hopper on Chasers (1994), and Miloš Forman on The People vs. Larry Flynt (1996). He also became the first actor to portray Andy Warhol in a widely released film, Oliver Stone's The Doors (1991).

Beginning in the 2000s, Glover chose the funding of his own films as a filmmaker to be the primary factor in deciding in which films he would act. After this decision, Glover featured more prominently in more mainstream films, starting with Charlie's Angels (2000), playing the role of the Thin Man, a role he reprised in the 2003 sequel. The character had initially been written as a speaking role, but Glover, noting that the lines as written were exposition, convinced the producers to eliminate the lines to create a precise image for the character. He went on to portray the titular character in Willard (2003), his first time portraying the protagonist in a studio-funded film. Glover appeared in Beowulf (2007) as the creature Grendel, playing the part through performance capture technology and speaking all his dialogue in Old English. The film was his first collaboration with director Robert Zemeckis since the original Back to the Future. In 2010, Glover played Ilosovic Stayne/the Knave of Hearts in Tim Burton's Alice in Wonderland and the one-armed bellhop Phil in Hot Tub Time Machine.

Glover portrayed his first series regular role on television as Mr. World in American Gods (2017–2021), while continuing to still act in films such as We Have Always Lived in the Castle (2018), Roger Avery's Lucky Day (2019), and the Bret Easton Ellis-scripted slasher film Smiley Face Killers (2020), directed by River's Edge director Tim Hunter. In 2022, he appeared in the Netflix horror anthology series Guillermo del Toro's Cabinet of Curiosities in the episode "Pickman's Model", (based on the H. P. Lovecraft work of the same name), as the title character.

=== Filmmaking ===
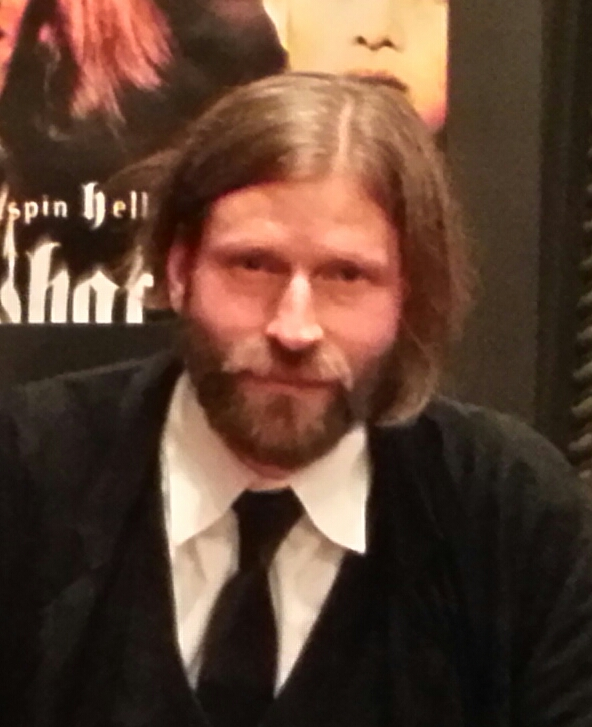
Glover after a screening of What Is It? at Indiana University in 2013

In 1987, Glover shot a short film on analog video based on his book The Backward Swing, that he co-directed with David Brothers. Post-production was never completed on the film. The first feature screenplay he wrote, The Jeff Jones Experience, which had Dennis Hopper, Gary Coleman, and himself attached to star, went unproduced.

Glover made his feature directorial debut with 2005's What Is It?, a surreal film featuring a cast of actors with Down syndrome. He considers this to be part of a trilogy he has dubbed the "It?" trilogy. It premiered at the 2005 Sundance Film Festival. With a budget of only $150,000, it took almost a decade to complete, and was originally intended to be a short film. Most of the primary footage was shot in 12 days, stretched over a two-and-a-half-year period. What Is It? was shot on 16 mm film stock, later being blown up to 35 mm movie film for projection.

Glover's second film and second part of the "It?" trilogy, It Is Fine! Everything Is Fine., was written by Utah writer and actor Steven C. Stewart and co-directed by David Brothers. Stewart was born with severe cerebral palsy and had been confined to a nursing home for about 10 years. The film is a fantastical psychosexual retelling of life from Stewart's point of view. Production was mostly funded by Glover's salary earned from Charlie's Angels and other films. It premiered at the 2007 Sundance Film Festival. Like What Is It?, It Is Fine! Everything Is Fine. also was shot on 16 mm film stock with the projection print blown up to 35 mm film.

Aside from select film festivals, Glover has not screened either film outside the confines of his live performances, which have taken place at theatres and venues around the world. The films have received accolades from associations such as the Ann Arbor Film Festival and Sitges Film Festival. In 2013, Glover was recognized for his directorial work when the Museum of Arts and Design in New York City staged the series It Is Crispin Hellion Glover. The program consisted of screenings of all of his directorial work, live performances, and speaking engagements.

Glover started shooting his third feature film, No! You're Wrong. or: Spooky Action at a Distance, in 2013 and filmed it intermittently over the next six years on his property in the Czech Republic, finishing in 2018. It premiered in 2025 at the Museum of Modern Art. Developed as a vehicle in which his father Bruce Glover and he could act together, it marked Bruce Glover's final film appearance. It is the first of Glover's productions to be filmed on 35 mm film stock. This film is not part three of the It? trilogy.

In 2024, filming for Glover's next feature, shot on Super 16 mm monochrome film stock, commenced.

He lists Luis Buñuel, Rainer Werner Fassbinder, Stanley Kubrick, and Werner Herzog as influences on his filmmaking. Glover was a co-interlocutor with Norm Hill and Werner Herzog for the special feature commentary for the DVD of Herzog's Even Dwarfs Started Small and Fata Morgana, in which he spoke of their influence on What Is It?.

=== Books ===
Glover claims to have published between 15 and 20 books. He constructs the books by reusing old novels and other publications that have fallen into the public domain due to their age (for example, Rat Catching was constructed from an 1896 book Studies in the Art of Rat Catching, and Oak-Mot was constructed from an 1868 novel of the same title). He rearranges text, blacks out certain standing passages, and adds his own prose (and sometimes images) into the margins and elsewhere, thus creating an entirely new story. Six of his books have been published to be bought publicly so far, through his publishing company, Volcanic Eruptions. His other known titles include The Backward Swing and A New World.

- Billow and the Rock (1983)
- Rat Catching (1988)
- Oak-Mot (1989)
- Concrete Inspection (1990)
- What it is, and How it is Done (1992)
- Round My House (2016)

* The publishing years listed above may not represent first-edition publication dates, but subsequent available editions.

Debuting in 1993 at the Olympia Film Festival, Crispin Hellion Glover’s Big Slide Show features Glover performing dramatic narration of Oak-Mot, Rat Catching, and other titles he has created while visual art from the books are projected behind him. Initially he toured the presentation with screenings of The Orkly Kid accompanying it, before preceding screenings of his directorial work with his performance of his Big Slide Show.

Glover wrote the introduction to the 1995 Fantagraphics Books collection of Daniel Clowes' Pussey! comic series. In 2000, Glover wrote a chapter in Adam Parfrey's transgressive anthology book Apocalypse Culture II. Sharing a title with his directional debut, "What Is It?", the essay is an overtly provocative and satirical questioning of the corporate restraints on American contemporary media and society, specifically targeting the influence of Steven Spielberg on mainstream culture.

Through the 2010s, Glover wrote a 500-page novel that focuses on propaganda in the American entertainment industry, as well as elements of his own work. The book remains unpublished.

=== Music ===
During a hiatus from films, Glover released an album titled The Big Problem Does Not Equal the Solution, The Solution Equals Let It Be in 1989 through Restless Records, produced by Barnes & Barnes. The album features original songs such as "Clowny Clown Clown", odd versions of Lee Hazlewood's "These Boots Are Made for Walkin'", and Charles Manson's "I'll Never Say Never to Always" (sung in falsetto), and readings from his art books Rat Catching and Oak Mot. Sample pages from these books are featured in the album's liner notes. He also directed a music video for "Clowny Clown Clown".

In 1994, Glover recorded a second album produced by Artie Barnes (Robert Haimer), which was to be titled The Big Love Recordings. It featured original songs and covers of songs such as Madonna's "Like a Virgin". A couple of planned tracks were never recorded, leaving the album unfinished and unreleased.

Glover recorded a version of the Michael Jackson song "Ben" to coincide with the release of his 2003 film Willard; the song had been written for the sequel to the original 1971 version of the film. In the music video for the song directed by Glover, he sings to a rat named Ben in front of a crowd of aroused women with his Willard co-star R. Lee Ermey portraying three male characters who resemble filmmaker Erich von Stroheim, actor Emil Jannings in the silent film The Last Laugh, and Adolf Hitler.

Several songs using Glover's name as the title have been recorded by various artists, including shoegaze/gothic rock band Scarling., and Chicago outsider musician Wesley Willis.

== Personal life ==
He has residences in Los Angeles, New York City, and the Czech Republic. His Czech residence Zámek Konárovice, 45 minutes east of Prague by train, is a 17th-century 20-acre (8.1 ha) château that is recognized as historically significant by the Czech government. Purchased in the early 2000s, he spent many years renovating the former horse stables of the château into sound stages to house sets used in his directorial feature films, including No! YOU'RE WRONG. or: Spooky Action at a Distance. The property requires constant upkeep and restoration; according to Glover, "[The property] is a lifetime project that will be in continuous flux and repair for hundreds of years from now, as it has been the hundreds of years before I 'owned' it."

Glover is single and has no children. From 2001 to 2003, Glover dated Alexa Lauren, a Penthouse magazine 'Pet of the Month' for September 1999.

From 2017 to 2020, Glover donated money to the Justice Democrats and the Bernie Sanders 2020 presidential campaign.

=== Late Night appearance ===
Glover appeared on Late Night with David Letterman on July 28, 1987, to promote River's Edge. To the surprise of Letterman and the audience, Glover appeared wearing platform shoes and a wig. During the interview, Glover behaved erratically and nearly kicked Letterman in the face, causing Letterman to walk off the set. Glover subsequently returned to the show a month later, laughing when Letterman asked him to explain his behaviour and failing to give a cohesive answer. Four years later, the film Rubin & Ed premiered, in which Glover had a starring role as titular character Rubin Farr, wearing a similar outfit to what he had worn on Late Night. After the release of Rubin & Ed, some speculated that Glover was acting in-character as Rubin Farr during his appearance on Late Night. Glover has refused to go into detail about the reasons for his behavior on the show, usually facetiously stating that he "neither confirms nor denies" he was on Letterman's show on July 28, 1987.

The character Rubin Farr also appears in Glover's music video for his 1989 song "Clowny Clown Clown". In 2006, Glover appeared in two YouTube videos with comedian Stevie Ryan dressed as Farr.

=== Back to the Future Part II lawsuit ===
In Back to the Future Part II, Zemeckis reused brief footage of Glover that had been filmed for the first film. Glover was billed as "George McFly in footage from Back to the Future" in the closing credits. The older footage was combined with new footage of actor Jeffrey Weissman wearing a false chin, nose, and cheekbones, and various obfuscating methods – in the background, wearing sunglasses, rear shot, upside down – to play George McFly. Because these methods suggested that Glover himself had performed for the film, he successfully sued the producers on the grounds that they had used his likeness without permission, as well as not having paid him for the reuse of the footage from the original film. The case was resolved outside of court and Glover was awarded a reported $760,000. As a result of the lawsuit, clauses in the Screen Actors Guild collective-bargaining agreements now state that producers and actors are not allowed to use such methods to reproduce the likeness of other actors, effectively putting to an end the decades-long use of the fake Shemp technique among living actors. The lawsuit is often evoked in cases for actors involving the misuse of their likeness through digital recreation and other technological methods to replicate their appearance without their permission.

=== 2026 lawsuit and counterclaim ===
In February 2026, Glover was sued by a woman alleging he had sexually groomed her and violated her civil and political rights by tracking her personal movements, not paying her for labor, holding her captive while forcing her to serve as his live-in girlfriend and sex slave, wrongfully evicting her, and choking her during an altercation.

Glover denied the allegations, stating that the accuser had stayed in his home in Los Angeles for roughly sixteen nights in early 2024, where she was free to leave at any time. He also claimed she began to act erratically after he refused to pretend to others they had been married in an Islamic wedding ceremony. Glover sought police and legal protection against the accuser in March 2024, after a physical altercation. She claims he choked her during the incident, which Glover denies. He claims to have deliberately avoided physical contact with her while she assaulted him by gouging his face with her nails, leading to her arrest for assault. He also confirmed in September 2025 the accuser's legal representation threatened him with a civil lawsuit if he did not pay an unspecified amount of money, which he refused, believing it to be attempted extortion.

In June 2026, Glover filed a counterclaim, accusing the woman of assault, battery, intrusion into private affairs, and trespassing.

== Filmmaking credits ==
| Year | Title | Director | Writer | Producer | Editor | Actor | Role | Notes |
|---|---|---|---|---|---|---|---|---|
| 2005 | What Is It? | Yes | Yes | Yes | Yes | Yes | Dueling Demi-God Auteur / The Young Man's Inner Psyche and Id | Also additional cinematography and music supervisor Ann Arbor Film Festival Jury Award for Best Narrative Film; Sitges Film Festival Midnight X-Treme Award; Method Fest Film Festival Maverick Award |
| 2007 | It Is Fine! Everything Is Fine. | Yes | No | Yes | Yes | No | —N/a | Co-director with David Brothers; also music supervisor Sitges Film Festival Special Jury Mention New Visions Award |
| 2025 | No! You're Wrong. or: Spooky Action at a Distance | Yes | Yes | Yes | Yes | Yes | Brutus Muldoon (1888) / Chronos Muldoon (1918) / Damocles Muldoon (1948) | |
| TBA | Untitled Project | Yes | Yes | Yes | Yes | TBA | | In production |

== Acting credits ==
=== Film ===
| Year | Title | Role | Notes |
|---|---|---|---|
| 1983 | My Tutor | Jack | |
| 1984 | Racing with the Moon | Gatsby Boy | |
| 1984 | Friday the 13th: The Final Chapter | Jimmy Mortimer | |
| 1984 | Teachers | Danny Reese | |
| 1985 | The Orkly Kid | Groovin' Larry Hoff | Short film |
| 1985 | Back to the Future | George McFly | Nominated—Saturn Award for Best Supporting Actor |
| 1986 | At Close Range | Lucas | |
| 1986 | River's Edge | Layne | |
| 1989 | Twister | Howard "Howdy" Cleveland | |
| 1990 | Where the Heart Is | Lionel | |
| 1990 | Wild at Heart | Cousin Dell | |
| 1991 | Little Noises | Joey Kremple | |
| 1991 | The Doors | Andy Warhol | |
| 1991 | Rubin and Ed | Rubin Farr | |
| 1991 | 30 Door Key | Mientus | |
| 1993 | Even Cowgirls Get the Blues | Howard Barth | |
| 1993 | What's Eating Gilbert Grape | Bobby McBurney | |
| 1994 | Chasers | Howard Finster | |
| 1995 | Dead Man | Train Fireman | |
| 1996 | The People vs. Larry Flynt | Arlo | |
| 2000 | Nurse Betty | Roy Ostery | |
| 2000 | Charlie's Angels | Thin Man | |
| 2001 | Bartleby | Bartleby | |
| 2001 | Fast Sofa | Jules Langdon | |
| 2002 | Crime and Punishment | Rodion Raskolnikov | |
| 2002 | Like Mike | Stan Bittleman | |
| 2003 | Willard | Willard Stiles | Nominated—Saturn Award for Best Actor; Nominated—Fangoria Chainsaw Award for Best Actor |
| 2003 | Charlie's Angels: Full Throttle | Thin Man / Anthony | |
| 2004 | Incident at Loch Ness | Party guest | Cameo |
| 2005 | Drop Dead Sexy | Eddie | |
| 2006 | Simon Says | Simon / Stanley | |
| 2006 | Brand upon the Brain! | Narrator (Live recording) | Voice |
| 2007 | Epic Movie | Willy | |
| 2007 | The Wizard of Gore | Montag the Magnificent | |
| 2007 | Beowulf | Grendel | Motion capture |
| 2008 | Open Season 2 | Fifi | Voice |
| 2008 | Freezer Burn: The Invasion of Laxdale | Viergacht | |
| 2009 | The Donner Party | William Foster | |
| 2009 | 9 | 6 | Voice |
| 2010 | Alice in Wonderland | Ilosovic Stayne / The Knave of Hearts | |
| 2010 | Hot Tub Time Machine | Phil Wedmaier | |
| 2010 | Mr. Nice | Ernie Combs | |
| 2010 | Open Season 3 | Fifi | Voice |
| 2012 | Freaky Deaky | Woody Ricks | |
| 2014 | The Bag Man | Ned | |
| 2015 | Hiszpanka | Dr. Abuse | |
| 2015 | Aimy in a Cage | Claude Bohringer | |
| 2018 | The Con is On | Gabriel Anderson | |
| 2018 | We Have Always Lived in the Castle | Uncle Julian Blackwood | |
| 2019 | Lucky Day | Luc | |
| 2020 | Smiley Face Killers | Hooded Figure | |
| 2024 | Mr. K | Mr. K | |
| 2025 | A Blind Bargain | Dr. Gruder | |
| 2027 | The Third Parent | Tommy Taffy | Post-production |
| TBA | Skinemax | TBA | Post-production |
| TBA | Death of a Brewer | J.J. Englert | Post-production |

=== Television ===
| Year | Title | Role | Notes |
|---|---|---|---|
| 1981 | The Best of Times | Crispin | Pilot |
| 1982 | The Facts of Life | Cadet No. 1 | Episode: "The Big Fight" |
| 1983 | The Kid with the 200 I.Q. | New Student | Television film |
| 1983 | High School U.S.A. | Archie Feld | Television film |
| 1983 | Happy Days | Roach | Episode: "Vocational Education" |
| 1983 | Hill Street Blues | Space Cadet | Episode: "Honk If You're a Goose" |
| 1984 | Family Ties | Doug | Episode: "Birthday Boy" |
| 1984 | High School U.S.A. | Archie Feld | Pilot |
| 1993 | Hotel Room | Danny | Episode: "Blackout" |
| 1994 | Duckman | Postal Worker | Voice, Credited as "L"; Episode "T.V. or Not to Be" |
| 2010 | Funny or Die Presents | Thomas Edison | Segment: "Drunk History Vol. 6" |
| 2015 | Texas Rising | Moseley Baker | 5 episodes |
| 2017–2021 | American Gods | Mr. World | 12 episodes |
| 2018 | Saat des Terrors | James Logan Davis | Television film |
| 2020 | Red Bird Lane | Jonah | Unaired HBO Max pilot |
| 2022 | Guillermo del Toro's Cabinet of Curiosities | Richard Upton Pickman | Episode: "Pickman's Model" |

=== Video game ===
| Year | Title | Voice role |
|---|---|---|
| 2010 | Alice in Wonderland | Ilosovic Stayne / The Knave of Hearts |

=== Music video ===
| Year | Song | Artist | Role | Notes |
|---|---|---|---|---|
| 1989 | "Clowny Clown Clown" | Crispin Glover | Man / Rubin Farr | Also director |
| 2003 | "Ben" | Crispin Glover | Willard | Also director |
